= List of Drexel Dragons men's basketball seasons =

The Drexel Dragons college basketball team competes in the National Collegiate Athletic Association (NCAA) Division I, representing Drexel University in the Colonial Athletic Association. The Dragons have played their home games at the Daskalakis Athletic Center in Philadelphia, Pennsylvania since 1975.

== Seasons ==
Conference champions	Conference tournament champions	Postseason berth

Season	Head coach	Conference	Season results							Conference tournament result	Postseason result	Final AP Poll
Season	Head coach	Conference	Overall			Conference				Conference tournament result	Postseason result	Final AP Poll
Season	Head coach	Conference	Wins	Losses	%	Wins	Losses	%	Finish	Conference tournament result	Postseason result	Final AP Poll
Drexel Dragons
1894–95	John Gray	Independent	7	2	.750	—	—	—	—	—	—	—
1895–96	F. Knight	Independent	0	1	.000	—	—	—	—	—	—	—
1896-97	No coach	Independent	?	?	?	—	—	—	—	—	—	—
1897-98	No team	—	—	—	—	—	—	—	—	—	—	—
1898-99	No team	—	—	—	—	—	—	—	—	—	—	—
1899–1900	No team	—	—	—	—	—	—	—	—	—	—	—
1900–01	No coach	Independent	?	?	?	—	—	—	—	—	—	—
1901–02	No coach	Independent	?	?	?	—	—	—	—	—	—	—
1902–03	No coach	Independent	?	?	?	—	—	—	—	—	—	—
1903–04	No coach	Independent	?	?	?	—	—	—	—	—	—	—
1904–05	No coach	Independent	?	?	?	—	—	—	—	—	—	—
1905–06	Walter S. Brokaw	Independent	11	4	.733	—	—	—	—	—	—	—
1906–07	Walter S. Brokaw	Independent	10	3	.769	—	—	—	—	—	—	—
1907–08	Walter S. Brokaw, F. Bennett	Independent	?	?	?	—	—	—	—	—	—	—
1908–09	F. Bennett, G. Doughty	Independent	?	?	?	—	—	—	—	—	—	—
1909–10	No coach	Independent	2	7	.222	—	—	—	—	—	—	—
1910–11	Frank Griffin	Independent	?	?	?	—	—	—	—	—	—	—
1911–12	Frank Griffin	Independent	?	?	?	—	—	—	—	—	—	—
1912–13	Frank Griffin	Independent	?	?	?	—	—	—	—	—	—	—
1913–14	No coach	Independent	?	?	?	—	—	—	—	—	—	—
1914–15	E.L. Lucas	Independent	?	?	?	—	—	—	—	—	—	—
1915–16	E.L. Lucas	Independent	?	?	?	—	—	—	—	—	—	—
1916–17	E.L. Lucas	Independent	?	?	?	—	—	—	—	—	—	—
1917–18	No coach	Independent	?	?	?	—	—	—	—	—	—	—
1918–19	James Barrett	Independent	?	?	?	—	—	—	—	—	—	—
1919–20	James Barrett	Independent	?	?	?	—	—	—	—	—	—	—
1920–21	William McAvoy	Independent	?	?	?	—	—	—	—	—	—	—
1921–22	William McAvoy	Independent	?	?	?	—	—	—	—	—	—	—
1922–23	Harvey O'Brien	Independent	?	?	?	—	—	—	—	—	—	—
1923–24	Harvey O'Brien	Independent	?	?	?	—	—	—	—	—	—	—
1924–25	Harvey O'Brien	Independent	?	?	?	—	—	—	—	—	—	—
1925–26	Ernest Lange	Independent	?	?	?	—	—	—	—	—	—	—
1926–27	Ernest Lange	Independent	?	?	?	—	—	—	—	—	—	—
1927–28	Walter Halas	Independent	?	?	?	—	—	—	—	—	—	—
1928–29	Walter Halas	Independent	10	9	.526	—	—	—	—	—	—	—
1929–30	Walter Halas	Independent	8	10	.444	—	—	—	—	—	—	—
1930–31	Walter Halas	Independent	10	10	.500	—	—	—	—	—	—	—
1931–32	Walter Halas	EPCBL	10	7	.588	5	7	.417	T-4th	—	—	—
1932–33	Walter Halas	EPCBL	2	16	.111	0	12	.000	7th	—	—	—
1933–34	Walter Halas	EPCBL	4	12	.250	2	10	.167	7th	—	—	—
1934–35	Ernest Lange	EPCBL	7	10	.412	4	8	.333	T-4th	—	—	—
1935–36	Ernest Lange	EPCBL	8	9	.471	6	6	.500	4th	—	—	—
1936–37	Ernest Lange	EPCBL	8	8	.500	5	7	.417	5th	—	—	—
1937–38	Ernest Lange	EPCBL	3	12	.200	1	11	.083	7th	—	—	—
1938–39	Ernest Lange	EPCBL	1	13	.071	0	12	.000	7th	—	—	—
1939–40	Lawrence Mains	Independent	3	13	.188	—	—	—	—	—	—	—
1940–41	Lawrence Mains	Independent	5	9	.357	—	—	—	—	—	—	—
1941–42	Lawrence Mains	Independent	9	5	.643	—	—	—	—	—	—	—
1942–43	Lawrence Mains	Independent	12	3	.800	—	—	—	—	—	—	—
1943–44	John Marino	Independent	4	5	.444	—	—	—	—	—	—	—
1944–45	Maury McMains	Independent	2	11	.154	—	—	—	—	—	—	—
1945–46	John McNally	MAC	2	14	.125	2	8	.200	? (Southern)	DNQ	—	—
1946–47	Ralph Chase	MAC	10	8	.556	7	3	.700	? (Southern)	DNQ	—	—
1947–48	Ralph Chase	MAC	5	14	.263	2	8	.200	? (Southern)	DNQ	—	—
1948–49	Ralph Chase	MAC	12	4	.750	7	3	.700	? (Southern)	DNQ	—	—
1949–50	Harold Kollar	MAC	11	5	.688	7	3	.700	? (Southern)	DNQ	—	—
1950–51	Harold Kollar	MAC	5	12	.294	3	7	.300	5th (Southern)	—	—	—
1951–52	Harold Kollar	MAC	9	10	.474	5	5	.500	3rd (Southern)	—	—	—
1952–53	Samuel Cozen	MAC	9	8	.529	6	4	.600	? (Southern)	—	—	—
1953–54	Samuel Cozen	MAC	15	3	.833	10	0	1.000	1st (College–Southern)	—	—	—
1954–55	Samuel Cozen	MAC	14	5	.737	9	1	.900	1st (College–Southern)	—	—	—
1955–56	Samuel Cozen	MAC	10	8	.556	8	2	.800	1st (College–Southern)	—	—	—
1956–57	Samuel Cozen	MAC	14	3	.824	10	0	1.000	1st (College–Southern)	—	NCAA first round (DII)	—
1957–58	Samuel Cozen	MAC	10	8	.556	8	5	.615	2nd (College–Southern)	DNQ	—	—
1958–59	Samuel Cozen	MAC	10	9	.526	8	3	.727	1st (College–Southern)	Final	—	—
1959–60	Samuel Cozen	MAC	12	7	.632	10	4	.714	1st (College–Southern)	Playoff Winner	NCAA first round (DII)	—
1960–61	Samuel Cozen	MAC	12	5	.706	11	2	.846	1st (College–Southern)	4th	—	—
1961–62	Samuel Cozen	MAC	11	8	.579	11	5	.688	? (College–Southern)	DNQ	—	—
1962–63	Samuel Cozen	MAC	18	5	.783	13	2	.867	1st (College–Southern)	3rd	—	—
1963–64	Samuel Cozen	MAC	17	5	.773	12	2	.857	1st (College–Southern)	Final	—	—
1964–65	Samuel Cozen	MAC	18	4	.818	11	2	.846	1st (College–Southern)	3rd	—	—
1965–66	Samuel Cozen	MAC	20	4	.833	12	0	1.000	1st (College–Southern)	Final	NCAA first round (DII)	—
1966–67	Samuel Cozen	MAC	13	10	.565	11	3	.786	1st (College–Southern)	Champion	NCAA first round (DII)	—
1967–68	Samuel Cozen, Robert Morgan	MAC	12	9	.571	9	5	.643	2nd (College–Southern)	Semifinals	—	—
1968–69	Frank Szymanski	MAC	8	11	.421	6	7	.462	? (College–Southern)	DNQ	—	—
1969–70	Frank Szymanski	MAC	11	11	.500	7	6	.538	5th (College–Southern)	DNQ	—	—
1970–71	Frank Szymanski	MAC	7	17	.292	0	6	.000	7th (University–Eastern)	DNQ	—	—
1971–72	Ray Haesler	MAC	11	14	.440	2	4	.333	T-4th (University–Eastern)	DNQ	—	—
1972–73	Ray Haesler	MAC	14	7	.667	2	4	.333	5th (University–Eastern)	DNQ	—	—
1973–74	Ray Haesler	MAC	15	9	.625	2	4	.333	5th (University–Eastern)	DNQ	—	—
1974–75	Ray Haesler	ECC	12	11	.522	0	6	.000	7th (East)	DNQ	—	—
1975–76	Ray Haesler	ECC	17	6	.739	3	2	.600	T-2nd (East)	DNQ	—	—
1976–77	Ray Haesler	ECC	11	13	.458	0	5	.000	6th (East)	DNQ	—	—
1977–78	Eddie Burke	ECC	13	13	.500	2	3	.400	T-3rd (East)	first round	—	—
1978–79	Eddie Burke	ECC	18	9	.667	6	5	.545	5th (East)	Quarterfinals	—	—
1979–80	Eddie Burke	ECC	12	15	.444	4	7	.364	6th (East)	first round	—	—
1980–81	Eddie Burke	ECC	14	13	.519	6	5	.545	5th (East)	Quarterfinals	—	—
1981–82	Eddie Burke	ECC	19	11	.633	7	4	.636	T-4th (East)	final	—	—
1982–83	Eddie Burke	ECC	14	15	.483	5	4	.556	4th (East)	Quarterfinals	—	—
1983–84	Eddie Burke	ECC	17	12	.586	10	6	.625	3rd	semifinals	—	—
1984–85	Eddie Burke	ECC	10	18	.357	8	6	.571	T-2nd	Quarterfinals	—	—
1985–86	Eddie Burke	ECC	19	12	.613	11	3	.786	1st	Champion	NCAA first round	—
1986–87	Eddie Burke	ECC	14	14	.500	7	7	.500	5th	Quarterfinals	—	—
1987–88	Eddie Burke	ECC	18	10	.643	9	5	.643	T-2nd	Quarterfinals	—	—
1988–89	Eddie Burke	ECC	12	16	.429	7	7	.500	T-4th	Quarterfinals	—	—
1989–90	Eddie Burke	ECC	13	15	.464	7	7	.500	T-4th	Quarterfinals	—	—
1990–91	Eddie Burke	ECC	12	16	.429	7	5	.583	T-3rd	Quarterfinals	—	—
1991–92	Bill Herrion	NAC	16	14	.533	9	5	.643	2nd	final	—	—
1992–93	Bill Herrion	NAC	22	7	.759	12	2	.857	T-1st	final	—	—
1993–94	Bill Herrion	NAC	25	5	.833	12	2	.857	1st	Champion	NCAA first round	—
1994–95	Bill Herrion	NAC	22	8	.733	12	4	.750	1st	Champion	NCAA first round	—
1995–96	Bill Herrion	NAC	27	4	.710	17	1	.710	1st	Champion	NCAA second round	RV
1996–97	Bill Herrion	AEC	22	9	.710	16	2	.889	2nd	semifinals	NIT Opening Round	—
1997–98	Bill Herrion	AEC	13	15	.464	10	8	.556	6th	semifinals	—	—
1998–99	Bill Herrion	AEC	20	9	.690	15	3	.833	T-1st	final	—	—
1999–2000	Steve Seymour	AEC	13	17	.433	9	9	.500	5th	semifinals	—	—
2000–01	Steve Seymour	AEC	15	12	.556	12	6	.667	3rd	Quarterfinals	—	—
2001–02	Bruiser Flint	CAA	14	14	.500	11	7	.611	T-3rd	Quarterfinals	—	—
2002–03	Bruiser Flint	CAA	19	12	.613	12	6	.667	T-2nd	final	NIT Opening Round	—
2003–04	Bruiser Flint	CAA	18	11	.621	13	5	.464	2nd	Quarterfinals	NIT first round	—
2004–05	Bruiser Flint	CAA	17	12	.586	12	6	.667	T-4th	Quarterfinals	NIT Opening Round	—
2005–06	Bruiser Flint	CAA	15	16	.484	8	10	.444	T-7th	first round	—	—
2006–07	Bruiser Flint	CAA	23	9	.719	13	5	.722	T-3rd	semifinals	NIT first round	—
2007–08	Bruiser Flint	CAA	12	20	.375	5	13	.278	T-10th	first round	—	—
2008–09	Bruiser Flint	CAA	15	14	.517	10	8	.556	6th	first round	—	—
2009–10	Bruiser Flint	CAA	16	16	.500	11	7	.611	T-5th	first round	—	—
2010–11	Bruiser Flint	CAA	21	10	.677	11	7	.611	5th	semifinals	—	—
2011–12	Bruiser Flint	CAA	29	7	.806	16	2	.889	1st	final	NIT Quarterfinals	RV
2012–13	Bruiser Flint	CAA	13	18	.419	9	9	.500	7th	Quarterfinals	—	—
2013–14	Bruiser Flint	CAA	16	14	.533	8	8	.500	4th	Quarterfinals	—	—
2014–15	Bruiser Flint	CAA	11	19	.367	9	9	.500	T-6th	first round	—	—
2015–16	Bruiser Flint	CAA	6	25	.194	3	15	.167	9th	Quarterfinals	—	—
2016–17	Zach Spiker	CAA	9	23	.281	3	15	.167	10th	first round	—	—
2017–18	Zach Spiker	CAA	13	20	.394	6	12	.333	T-7th	Quarterfinals	—	—
2018–19	Zach Spiker	CAA	13	19	.406	7	11	.389	T-6th	Quarterfinals	—	—
2019–20	Zach Spiker	CAA	14	19	.424	6	12	.333	8th	Quarterfinals	Cancelled (coronavirus)	—
2020–21	Zach Spiker	CAA	12	8	.600	4	5	.444	6th	Champion	NCAA first round	—
2021–22	Zach Spiker	CAA	15	14	.517	10	8	.556	T-4th	Quarterfinals	—	—
2022–23	Zach Spiker	CAA	17	15	.531	10	8	.556	5th	Quarterfinals	—	—
2023–24	Zach Spiker	CAA	20	12	.625	13	5	.722	2nd	Quarterfinals	—	—
2024–25	Zach Spiker	CAA	18	15	.545	9	9	.500	T-7th	Quarterfinals	—	—
2025–26	Zach Spiker	CAA	17	16	.515	10	8	.556	T-5th	Quarterfinals	—	—

== See also ==
List of Drexel Dragons women's basketball seasons
