= 1957–58 Drexel Dragons men's basketball team =

American college basketball season

1957–58 Drexel Dragons men's basketball
- Conference: Middle Atlantic Conferences
- College–Southern
- Record: 10–8 (8–5 MAC)
- Head coach: Samuel Cozen (6th season)
- Home arena: Sayre High School

1957–58 MAC men's basketball standings
	Conf.				Overall
Team	W		L	PCT	W		L	PCT
University
Temple		–		–	27	–	3	.900
College–Northern
Wagner †		–		–	18	–	9	.667
College–Southern
Franklin & Marshall		–		–		–		–
Drexel	8	–	5	.615	10	–	8	.556
Haverford	7	–	5	.583	11	–	6	.647
Pennsylvania Military College		–		–		–		–
† 1958 MAC men's basketball tournament winner

The 1957–58 Drexel Dragons men's basketball team represented Drexel Institute of Technology during the 1957–58 men's basketball season. The Dragons, led by 6th year head coach Samuel Cozen, played their home games at Sayre High School and were members of the College–Southern division of the Middle Atlantic Conferences (MAC).

== Roster ==
1957–58 Drexel Dragons men's basketball team
Players
Coaches

Pos.	#	Name	Height	Weight	Year	Previous school	Hometown
		Robert Seher	—	—
		Allan Weinberg	—	—
		Ronald Kleppinger	—	—
		Charles Morrow	—	—
		Robert Greenberg	—	—
		George Butler	—	—
		Wayne Gutekunst	—	—
		William White	—	—
		George Holloway	—	—
		Marty Baum	—	—
		Ron B.	—	—
		Bill Campbell	—	—
		John Deufel	—	—
		Irv Jaffe	—	—
		Cona (I)	—	—

Head coach

- Samuel Cozen (Temple)

Assistant coach(es)

Legend

- (C) Team captain
- (S) Suspended
- (I) Ineligible
- (W) Walk-on
- Injured
- Current redshirt

Roster

== Schedule ==
Date time, TV	Rank^{#}	Opponent^{#}	Result	Record	High points	High rebounds	High assists	Site (attendance) city, state
Regular season
January 4, 1958		at Delaware	L 56–60	0–1 (0–1)	15 – Morrow	12 – Kleppinger	–	Newark, DE
January 8, 1968		at Pennsylvania Military College	W 64–62	1–1 (1–1)	19 – Morrow	–	–	Hyatt Armory; Chester, PA
January 11, 1958		Swarthmore	W 61–51	2–1 (2–1)	31 – Morrow	–	–	Sayre High School; Philadelphia, PA
January 15, 1958		at Haverford	W 96–88	3–1 (3–1)	34 – Kleppinger	13 – Kleppinger	–	Ryan Gym; Haverford, PA
January 18, 1958*		Saint Joseph's	L 77–99	3–2	21 – Seher	8 – Kleppinger	–	Sayre High School; Philadelphia, PA
January 21, 1958		at Ursinus	W 91–65	4–2 (4–1)	16 – Weinberg	–	–	Collegeville, PA
January 25, 1958*		at Coast Guard	L 59–78	4–3	16 – Weinberg	–	–	New London, CT
January 29, 1958*		Pratt	W 80–57	5–3	15 – Kleppinger	–	–	Sayre High School; Philadelphia, PA
February 1, 1958		at Juniata	L 78–79 ^{OT}	5–4 (4–2)	25 – Kleppinger	18 – Morrow	–	Memorial Gym; Huntingdon, PA
February 8, 1958		at Wagner	L 47–66	5–5 (4–3)	10 – Tied	–	–	
February 12, 1958		at Swarthmore	W 76–67	6–5 (5–3)	20 – Morrow	–	–	
February 15, 1968		Pennsylvania Military College	L 74–83	6–6 (5–4)	29 – Keppinger	–	–	Sayre High School; Philadelphia, PA
February 17, 1958		Franklin & Marshall	Postponed to March 3					Sayre High School; Philadelphia, PA
February 19, 1958*		at West Chester	L 87–89	6–7	26 – Seher	13 – Butler	–	
February 22, 1958*		Susquehanna	W 69–43	7–7	18 – Morrow	12 – Tied	–	Sayre High School; Philadelphia, PA
February 24, 1958		Delaware	W 97–77	8–7 (6–4)	–	–	–	Sayre High School; Philadelphia, PA
February 26, 1958		Haverford	W 87–64	9–7 (7–4)	– Morrow	20 – Morrow	–	Sayre High School; Philadelphia, PA
March 1, 1958		Ursinus	W 78–64	10–7 (8–4)	27 – Morrow	–	–	Sayre High School; Philadelphia, PA
March 3, 1958		Franklin & Marshall; Make-up for Rescheduled Game	L 67–75	10–8 (8–5)	20 – Keppinger	12 – Morrow	–	Sayre High School; Philadelphia, PA
*Non-conference game. ^{#}Rankings from AP. (#) Tournament seedings in parentheses. All times are in Eastern Time.
