= 1958–59 Drexel Dragons men's basketball team =

American college basketball season

1958–59 Drexel Dragons men's basketball

MAC College–Southern Regular Season Champions
- Conference: Middle Atlantic Conferences
- College–Southern
- Record: 10–9 (8–3 MAC)
- Head coach: Samuel Cozen (7th season)
- Home arena: Sayre High School

The 1958–59 Drexel Dragons men's basketball team represented Drexel Institute of Technology during the 1958–59 men's basketball season. The Dragons, led by 7th year head coach Samuel Cozen, played their home games at Sayre High School and were members of the College–Southern division of the Middle Atlantic States Collegiate Athletic Conference (MASCAC).

The team finished the season 10–9, and finished in 1st place in the MAC in the regular season. They were defeated by Hofstra in the conference championship game.

== Roster ==
1958–59 Drexel Dragons men's basketball team
Players
Coaches

Pos.	#	Name	Height	Weight	Year	Previous school	Hometown
		Bud Henry	—	—
		Marty Baum	—	—
		Rich Hilmer	—	—
		Bruce Zimmerman	—	—
		Robert Morgan	—	—
		Weinberg	—	—
		Irv Jaffe	—	—
		Robert Greenberg	—	—
		George Butler	—	—
		John Deufel	—	—

Head coach

- Samuel Cozen (Temple)

Assistant coach(es)

Legend

- (C) Team captain
- (S) Suspended
- (I) Ineligible
- (W) Walk-on
- Injured
- Current redshirt

Roster

== Schedule ==
Date time, TV	Rank^{#}	Opponent^{#}	Result	Record	High points	High rebounds	High assists	Site (attendance) city, state
Regular season
Unknown*		Rider	L 62–70	0–1	–	–	–	
Unknown		Pennsylvania Military College	L 68–74	0–2 (0–1)	–	–	–	
Unknown		Haverford	L 48–65	0–3 (0–2)	–	–	–	Sayre High School; Philadelphia, PA
Unknown		Ursinus	W 81–55	1–3 (1–2)	–	–	–	
Unknown*		Villanova	L 46–62	1–4	–	–	–	
Unknown		Wagner	W 67–65	2–4 (2–2)	–	–	–	
Unknown*		Pratt	W 54–44	3–4	–	–	–	
Unknown		Juniata	W 91–77	4–4 (3–2)	–	–	–	Sayre High School; Philadelphia, PA
February 4, 1959		at Swarthmore	W 81–64	5–4 (4–2)	–	–	–	
February 7, 1959*		at Johns Hopkins	W 79–61	6–4	–	–	–	
February 11, 1959		Swarthmore	W 97–69	7–4 (5–2)	–	–	–	Sayre High School; Philadelphia, PA
Unknown		Pennsylvania Military College	W 80–58	8–4 (6–2)	–	–	–	
1959		at Haverford	W 77–62 ^{OT}	9–4 (7–2)	–	–	–	Ryan Gym; Haverford, PA
February 21, 1959		Susquehanna	L 79–85	9–5 (7–3)	–	–	–	
February 24, 1959*		at Saint Joseph's	L 59–82	9–6	–	–	–	
Unknown		Ursinus	W 77–54	10–6 (8–3)	–	–	–	
1959 Middle Atlantic Conference men's basketball tournament
March 3, 1959		Hofstra; Conference Championship	L 64–70	10–7	19 – Morgan	–	–	
Regular season
March 4, 1959*		West Chester	L 65–84	10–8	–	–	–	Sayre High School; Philadelphia, PA
March 7, 1959*		at Franklin & Marshall	L 64–75	10–9	–	–	–	
*Non-conference game. ^{#}Rankings from AP. (#) Tournament seedings in parentheses. All times are in Eastern Time.
