= 1961–62 Drexel Dragons men's basketball team =

American college basketball season

1961–62 Drexel Dragons men's basketball
- Conference: Middle Atlantic Conferences
- College–Southern
- Record: 11–8 (11–5 MAC)
- Head coach: Samuel Cozen (10th season)
- Assistant coach: Bobby Morgan (1st season)
- Captains: Ben Brown; Herb Heffner
- Home arena: Sayre High School

The 1961–62 Drexel Dragons men's basketball team represented Drexel Institute of Technology during the 1961–62 men's basketball season. The Dragons, led by 10th year head coach Samuel Cozen, played their home games at Sayre High School and were members of the College–Southern division of the Middle Atlantic Conferences (MAC).

== Roster ==
1961–62 Drexel Dragons men's basketball team
Players	Coaches
Pos. / # / Name / Height / Weight / Year / Previous school / Hometown; / / / — / —	Head coach: Samuel Cozen (Temple); Assistant coach(es) Legend: (C) Team captain; (S) Suspended; (I) Ineligible; (W) Walk-on; Injured; Current redshirt

== Schedule ==
Date time, TV	Rank^{#}	Opponent^{#}	Result	Record	High points	High rebounds	High assists	Site (attendance) city, state
Regular season
Unknown*		Rider	L 64–68	0–1	–	–	–	
December 19th, 1961*		Pratt	L 57–60	0–2	–	–	–	
January 3, 1962*		at Delaware	L 62–89	0–3	–	–	–	Newark, DE
Unknown		at Pennsylvania Military College	L 63–84	0–4 (0–1)	–	–	–	
January 10, 1962		Haverford	W 67–53	1–4 (1–1)	20 – Brown	–	–	Sayre High School; Philadelphia, PA
January 13, 1962; 3:30 pm		Elizabethtown	W 75–62	2–4 (2–1)	25 – King	–	–	Sayre High School; Philadelphia, PA
January 15, 1962; 8:30 pm		Ursinus	W 94–48	3–4 (3–1)	18 – King	10 – Tied	–	Sayre High School; Philadelphia, PA
January 17, 1962; 8:30 pm		at Wagner	L 58–78	3–5 (3–2)	–	–	–	
January 20, 1962; 8:00 pm		at Washington (MD)	W 68–50	4–5 (4–2)	16 – King	–	–	Chestertown, MD
January 27, 1962; 2:00 pm		Lycoming	W 80–58	5–5 (5–2)	18 – Brown	–	–	Sayre High School; Philadelphia, PA
Unknown*		Dickinson	W 67–49	6–5	–	–	–	
February 3, 1962; 3:30 pm		at Franklin & Marshall	L 56–61	6–6	25 – King	–	–	Lancaster, PA
February 5, 1962; 8:30 pm		Johns Hopkins	W 95–43	7–6 (7–3)	20 – Heffner	–	–	Sayre High School; Philadelphia, PA
February 7, 1962; 8:30 pm		at Swarthmore	W 68–57	8–6 (8–3)	20 – Zimmerman	17 – Heffner	–	
February 10, 1962; 2:30 pm		Pennsylvania Military College	L 84–95 ^{OT}	8–7 (8–4)	18 – Heffner	15 – Heffner	5 – Zimmerman	Sayre High School; Philadelphia, PA
February 13, 1962		at Haverford	L 65–72 ^{OT}	8–8 (8–5)	–	–	–	Ryan Gym; Haverford, PA
February 17, 1962*; 2:30 pm		at Juniata	W 70–53	9–8 (9–5)	–	–	–	
February 19, 1962; 8:00 pm		at Lebanon Valley	W 86–52	10–8 (10–5)	25 – Heffner	14 – Heffner	–	
February 24, 1962; 8:30 pm		at Ursinus	W 63–45	11–8 (11–5)	–	–	–	Collegeville, PA
*Non-conference game. ^{#}Rankings from AP. (#) Tournament seedings in parentheses. All times are in Eastern Time.
