= 1953–54 Drexel Dragons men's basketball team =

American college basketball season

1953–54 Drexel Dragons men's basketball

MAC College–Southern Regular Season Champions
- Conference: Middle Atlantic Conferences
- College–Southern
- Record: 15–3 (10–0 MAC)
- Head coach: Samuel Cozen (2nd season)
- Captains: Dan Promislo; Richard Walter
- Home arena: Sayre High School

The 1953–54 Drexel Dragons men's basketball team represented Drexel Institute of Technology during the 1953–54 men's basketball season. The Dragons, led by 2nd year head coach Samuel Cozen, played their home games at Sayre High School and were members of the College–Southern division of the Middle Atlantic Conferences (MAC).

The team finished the season 15–3, and finished in 1st place in the MAC in the regular season.

== Roster ==
1953–54 Drexel Dragons men's basketball team
Players
Coaches

Pos.	#	Name	Height	Weight	Year	Previous school	Hometown
	3	Stanton Woerth	6 ft 2 in (1.88 m)	—
	4	Joseph Campbell	5 ft 11 in (1.8 m)	—
	5	Victor Quattrini	5 ft 8.5 in (1.74 m)	—
	6	Edward O'Brien	5 ft 10 in (1.78 m)	—
	7	William Harley	6 ft 0 in (1.83 m)	—
	8	Edward Roman	6 ft 2 in (1.88 m)	—
	9	Eugene Szukalski	5 ft 11 in (1.8 m)	—
	10	Arthur Jones	5 ft 10 in (1.78 m)	—
	11	J. Richard Walker	6 ft 3 in (1.91 m)	—
	12	Bob Ranonis	6 ft 3.5 in (1.92 m)	—
	14	Joseph Scafaria	6 ft 0 in (1.83 m)	—
	15	Richard McGarrity	6 ft 2 in (1.88 m)	—
	16	Alan Meislich	6 ft 2.5 in (1.89 m)	—
	17	Dan Promislo	6 ft 2.5 in (1.89 m)	—
		Edwin Neuman	—	—
		Ralph Capazzoli	—	—
		Hyde	—	—

Head coach

- Samuel Cozen (Temple)

Assistant coach(es)

Legend

- (C) Team captain
- (S) Suspended
- (I) Ineligible
- (W) Walk-on
- Injured
- Current redshirt

Roster

== Schedule ==
Date time, TV	Rank^{#}	Opponent^{#}	Result	Record	High points	High rebounds	High assists	Site (attendance) city, state
Regular season
December 18, 1953*		Drexel Alumni						Curtis Hall Gym; Philadelphia, PA
January 7, 1954*		Franklin & Marshall	W 62–61	1–0	14 – Tied	–	–	Sayre High School; Philadelphia, PA
January 9, 1954		at Haverford	W 84–47	2–0 (1–0)	19 – Walter	–	–	Ryan Gym; Haverford, PA
January 16, 1954		at Swarthmore	W 85–79	3–0 (2–0)	31 – Quattrini	–	–	
January 20, 1954		Pennsylvania Military College	W 74–61	4–0 (3–0)	–	–	–	Sayre High School; Philadelphia, PA
January 27, 1954*		at West Chester; First Game at Hollinger Field House	W 66–58	5–0	13 – Tied	–	–	Hollinger Field House; West Chester, PA
January 30, 1954*; 2:00 pm		Rutgers–Camden	W 106–65	6–0	–	–	–	Curtis Hall Gym; Philadelphia, PA
February 4, 1954*		at Temple	L 62–100	6–1	–	–	–	South Hall; Philadelphia, PA
February 6, 1954		Ursinus	W 81–53	7–1 (4–0)	18 – Jones	–	–	Sayre High School; Philadelphia, PA
February 10, 1954*		at Saint Joseph's	L 59–69	7–2	16 – Promislo	–	–	
February 13, 1954		at Ursinus	W 74–70	8–2 (5–0)	26 – Promislo	–	–	Collegeville, PA
February 15, 1954*		Lebanon Valley	L 51–76	8–3	13 – Promislo	–	–	Sayre High School; Philadelphia, PA
February 17, 1954		Haverford	W 91–63	9–3 (6–0)	18 – Promislo	–	–	Sayre High School; Philadelphia, PA
February 20, 1954		at Delaware	W 63–60 ^{OT}	10–3 (7–0)	16 – Promislo	–	–	Newark, DE
February 24, 1954		Swarthmore	W 80–43	11–3 (8–0)	17 – Promislo	–	–	Sayre High School; Philadelphia, PA
February 27, 1954*		at Philadelphia Pharmacy	W 106–81	12–3	16 – Promislo	–	–	
March 1, 1954*		at Philadelphia Textile	W 72–16	13–3	19 – Promislo	–	–	Belfield Recreation Center; Philadelphia, PA
March 3, 1954		at Pennsylvania Military College	W 71–60	14–3 (9–0)	25 – Promislo	–	–	Chester, PA
March 6, 1954		Delaware	W 83–64	15–3 (10–0)	–	–	–	Philadelphia, PA
*Non-conference game. ^{#}Rankings from AP. (#) Tournament seedings in parentheses. All times are in Eastern Time.
