= 1955–56 Drexel Dragons men's basketball team =

American college basketball season

1955–56 Drexel Dragons men's basketball

MAC College–Southern Regular Season Champions
- Conference: Middle Atlantic Conferences
- College–Southern
- Record: 10–8 (8–2 MAC)
- Head coach: Samuel Cozen (4th season)
- Home arena: Sayre High School

The 1955–56 Drexel Dragons men's basketball team represented Drexel Institute of Technology during the 1955–56 men's basketball season. The Dragons, led by 4th year head coach Samuel Cozen, played their home games at Sayre High School and were members of the College–Southern division of the Middle Atlantic Conferences (MAC).

The team finished the season 10–8, and finished in 1st place in the MAC in the regular season.

== Roster ==
1955–56 Drexel Dragons men's basketball team
Players
Coaches

Pos.	#	Name	Height	Weight	Year	Previous school	Hometown
	4	Joseph Campbell	—	—
	5	Robert Seher	—	—
	6	Edward O'Brien	—	—
	7	William Harley	—	—
	9	Eugene Szukalski	—	—
	10	John Loomis	—	—
	14	William White	—	—
	15	Ronald Kleppinger	—	—
	16	Lawrence Humes	—	—
	17	Robert Buckley	—	—
		Martin Weinberg	—	—
		Gary Brotz	—	—
		Cyrus Cohen	—	—

Head coach

- Samuel Cozen (Temple)

Assistant coach(es)

Legend

- (C) Team captain
- (S) Suspended
- (I) Ineligible
- (W) Walk-on
- Injured
- Current redshirt

Roster

== Schedule ==
Date time, TV	Rank^{#}	Opponent^{#}	Result	Record	High points	High rebounds	High assists	Site (attendance) city, state
Regular season
January 4, 1956*		Lebanon Valley	W 77–55	1–0	27 – Buckley	–	–	Philadelphia, PA
January 7, 1956		Delaware	W 75–52	2–0 (1–0)	–	–	–	Philadelphia, PA
January 11, 1956		Swarthmore	W 86–66	3–0 (2–0)	25 – Buckley	–	–	Sayre High School; Philadelphia, PA
January 14, 1956		at Ursinus	W 81–63	4–0 (3–0)	–	–	–	Collegeville, PA
January 17, 1956*		vs. Saint Joseph's	L 57–83	4–1	21 – Kleppinger	17 – Buckley	–	Palestra (2,047); Philadelphia, PA
January 25, 1956*		Millersville	L 76–87 ^{2OT}	4–2	17 – Loomis	–	–	Sayre High School; Philadelphia, PA
January 28, 1956*		at Susquehanna	L 62–68	4–3	–	–	–	
February 1, 1956*		at West Chester	W 59–57	5–3	13 – Loomis	–	–	Hollinger Field House; West Chester, PA
February 4, 1956*; 3:30 pm		Franklin & Marshall	L 57–63	5–4	–	–	–	Sayre High School; Philadelphia, PA
February 8, 1956		Pennsylvania Military College	W 62–58	6–4 (4–0)	17 – Campbell	–	–	Sayre High School; Philadelphia, PA
February 11, 1956; 3:30 pm		Haverford	W 66–54	7–4 (5–0)	–	–	–	Sayre High School; Philadelphia, PA
February 15, 1956		at Delaware	L 70–83	7–5 (5–1)	25 – Loomis	–	–	Newark, DE
February 18, 1956		at Swarthmore	W 79–66	8–5 (6–1)	–	–	–	
February 22, 1956		Ursinus	W 96–66	9–5 (7–1)	–	–	–	Sayre High School; Philadelphia, PA
February 25, 1956		at Pennsylvania Military College	L 62–79	9–6 (7–2)	–	–	–	Chester, PA
February 28, 1956		at Haverford	W 68–56	10–6 (8–2)	15 – Kleppinger	–	–	Ryan Gym; Haverford, PA
March 3, 1956*		at Elizabethtown	L 72–86	10–7	–	–	–	
March 6, 1956*		Villanova	L 55–77	10–8	–	–	–	Sayre High School; Philadelphia, PA
*Non-conference game. ^{#}Rankings from AP. (#) Tournament seedings in parentheses. All times are in Eastern Time.
