= 1925–26 Drexel Blue and Gold men's basketball team =

American college basketball season

1925–26 Drexel Blue and Gold men's basketball
- Conference: Independent
- Record: –
- Head coach: Ernest Lange (1st season)
- Home arena: Main Building

The 1925–26 Drexel Blue and Gold men's basketball team represented Drexel Institute of Art, Science and Industry during the 1925–26 men's basketball season. The Blue and Gold, led by 1st year head coach Ernest Lange, played their home games at Main Building.

== Roster ==
1925–26 Drexel Dragons men's basketball team
Players
Coaches

Pos.	#	Name	Height	Weight	Year	Previous school	Hometown
F		Christian Schwartz (C)	—	—	So
F		Albert Hey	—	—	Fr	South Philadelphia HS
C		Fortin	—	—		Allentown Preparatory School
G		Joseph Foley	—	—	Jr
G		Carl Gregory	—	—	So	Latrobe HS
		Proctor	—	—
C		Michael Dugan	—	—	Sr
		Vreeland	—	—
		Pete Jones	—	—
		Hartman	—	—
		Hornack	—	—
		Outwater	—	—
		Kurtz	—	—
		Hannen	—	—
		Sleigle	—	—
		Dunklegerger	—	—

Head coach

- Ernest Lange (Wisconsin)

Assistant coach(es)

Legend

- (C) Team captain
- (S) Suspended
- (I) Ineligible
- (W) Walk-on
- Injured
- Current redshirt

== Schedule ==
Date time, TV	Rank^{#}	Opponent^{#}	Result	Record	High points	High rebounds	High assists	Site (attendance) city, state
Regular season
December 1, 1925*		Philadelphia Textile	W 25–13	1–0	–	–	–	
December 5, 1925*		Rutgers	L 39–40 ^{OT}	1–1	11 – Hey	–	–	
December 12, 1925*		at Haverford	L 45–46 ^{OT}	1–2	–	–	–	Ryan Gym; Haverford, PA
January 9, 1926*		Swarthmore	L 13–34	1–3	10 – Hey	–	–	Main Building; Philadelphia, PA
January 14, 1926*		at Delaware	L 15–25	1–4	–	–	–	Taylor Gym; Newark, DE
January 16, 1926*		Seton Hall	W 30–17	2–4	–	–	–	Main Building; Philadelphia, PA
January 21, 1926*		Susquehanna	W 32–20	3–4	–	–	–	Main Building; Philadelphia, PA
January 23, 1926*		at Pennsylvania Military College	L 26–34		17 – Hey	–	–	Chester, PA
January 30, 1926*		Saint Joseph's	L 16–26		–	–	–	Main Building; Philadelphia, PA
February 5, 1926*		at Susquehanna	W –	4–?	–	–	–	
February 6, 1926*		Upsala	W 30–18	5–?	23 – Hey	–	–	Main Building; Philadelphia, PA
February 17, 1926*; 8:00 pm		at Temple	L 16–29		6 – Hey	–	–	Conwell Hall; Philadelphia, PA
February 23, 1926*		at Carnegie Tech	L 30–34		–	–	–	Pittsburgh, PA
February 26, 1926*		at Upsala	L 32–33		–	–	–	
February 27, 1926*		at Seton Hall	L 21–25		–	–	–	
Unknown*		Gallaudet						
*Non-conference game. ^{#}Rankings from AP. (#) Tournament seedings in parentheses. All times are in Eastern Time.
