= 1938–39 Drexel Dragons men's basketball team =

American college basketball season

1938–39 Drexel Dragons men's basketball
- Conference: Eastern Pennsylvania Collegiate Basketball League
- Record: 1–13 (0–12 EPCBL)
- Head coach: Ernest Lange (7th season)
- Home arena: Curtis Hall Gym

1938–39 EPCBL men's basketball standings
	Conf.				Overall
Team	W		L	PCT	W		L	PCT
Gettysburg	11	–	1	.917	17	–	2	.895
Franklin & Marshall	9	–	3	.750	14	–	4	.778
Muhlenberg	7	–	5	.583		–		–
Lebanon Valley		–		–		–		–
Ursinus		–		–		–		–
Albright		–		–		–		–
Drexel	0	–	12	.000	1	–	13	.071

The 1938–39 Drexel Dragons men's basketball team represented Drexel Institute of Technology during the 1938–39 men's basketball season. The Dragons, led by 7th year head coach Ernest Lange, played their home games at Curtis Hall Gym and were members of the Eastern Pennsylvania Collegiate Basketball League (EPCBL).

== Roster ==
1938–39 Drexel Dragons men's basketball team
Players
Coaches

Pos.	#	Name	Height	Weight	Year	Previous school	Hometown
F		William Kulesh	—	—
G		Elwood Conard	—	—
G		Joseph Lambert (C)	—	—
F		Joseph McCracken	—	—
F		Richard Bennett	—	—
C		Jack Etsweiler	6 ft 4 in (1.93 m)	—	So
C	13	Kenneth Rodgers	—	—
G		Leonard Barris	—	—
F		Joseph Barron	—	—
G		Wolf	—	—
C		Harroll	—	—

Head coach

- Ernest Lange (Wisconsin)

Assistant coach(es)

Legend

- (C) Team captain
- (S) Suspended
- (I) Ineligible
- (W) Walk-on
- Injured
- Current redshirt

== Schedule ==
Date time, TV	Rank^{#}	Opponent^{#}	Result	Record	High points	High rebounds	High assists	Site (attendance) city, state
Exhibition
Unknown*		vs. Saint Joseph's; Sharon Hill Gym Dedication	L –	0–1	–	–	–	Sharon Hill High School; Sharon Hill, PA
Regular season
January 4, 1939		at Franklin & Marshall	L 26–36	0–1 (0–1)	–	–	–	
January 11, 1939		at Muhlenberg	L 44–53	0–2 (0–2)	12 – McCracken	–	–	Allentown, PA
January 14, 1939		Lebanon Valley	L 37–39	0–3 (0–3)	11 – Lambert	–	–	Curtis Hall Gym; Philadelphia, PA
January 18, 1939*		at Swarthmore	L 33–60	0–4	17 – Barris	–	–	
January 21, 1939		Franklin & Marshall	L 34–38	0–5 (0–4)	9 – Kulesh	–	–	Curtis Hall Gym; Philadelphia, PA
January 24, 1939		at Gettysburg	L 26–55	0–6 (0–5)	11 – Kulesh	–	–	Gettysburg, PA
February 2, 1939		at Albright	L 38–48	0–7 (0–6)	11 – Tied	–	–	Reading, PA
February 4, 1939*		at Brooklyn Polytech	W 37–32	1–7	9 – Estweiler	–	–	
February 6, 1939		Ursinus	L 37–44	1–8 (0–7)	–	–	–	Curtis Hall Gym; Philadelphia, PA
February 11, 1939		Gettysburg	L 27–37	1–9 (0–8)	9 – Rodgers	–	–	Curtis Hall Gym; Philadelphia, PA
February 18, 1939		at Lebanon Valley	L 33–46	1–10 (0–9)	10 – Kulesh	–	–	Lebanon High School; Lebanon, PA
February 25, 1939		Albright	L 34–48	1–11 (0–10)	12 – Wolf	–	–	Curtis Hall Gym; Philadelphia, PA
February 28, 1939		at Ursinus	L 34–40	1–12 (0–11)	9 – Bennett	–	–	
March 3, 1939		Muhlenberg	L 41–47	1–13 (0–12)	19 – Conard	–	–	Curtis Hall Gym; Philadelphia, PA
*Non-conference game. ^{#}Rankings from AP. (#) Tournament seedings in parentheses. All times are in Eastern Time.

== Awards ==
Bill Kulesh

- EPCBL All-Conference Second Team
