= 1932–33 Drexel Dragons men's basketball team =

American college basketball season

1932–33 Drexel Dragons men's basketball
- Conference: Eastern Pennsylvania Collegiate Basketball League
- Record: 2–16 (0–12 EPCBL)
- Head coach: Walter Halas (6th season)
- Captain: Bill Johnson
- Home arena: Curtis Hall Gym

1932–33 EPCBL men's basketball standings
	Conf.				Overall
Team	W		L	PCT	W		L	PCT
Gettysburg	10	–	2	.833		–		–
Franklin & Marshall	8	–	4	.667	9	–	6	.600
Albright	8	–	4	.667		–		–
Ursinus	6	–	6	.500		–		–
Muhlenberg	6	–	6	.500		–		–
Lebanon Valley	4	–	8	.333	5	–	12	.294
Drexel	0	–	12	.000	2	–	16	.111

The 1932–33 Drexel Dragons men's basketball team represented Drexel Institute of Art, Science and Industry during the 1932–33 men's basketball season. The Dragons, led by 6th year head coach Walter Halas, played their home games at Curtis Hall Gym and were members of the Eastern Pennsylvania Collegiate Basketball League (EPCBL).

== Roster ==
1932–33 Drexel Dragons men's basketball team
Players
Coaches

Pos.	#	Name	Height	Weight	Year	Previous school	Hometown
G		Henry Wallace	—	—	So
		Mered Hoff	—	—
		Walter Kline	—	—
		Elmer Cook	—	—
		Charles Knapp	—	—
		Max Reider	—	—
F		Bill Johnson (C)	—	—	Sr

Head coach

- Walter Halas (Illinois)

Assistant coach(es)

Legend

- (C) Team captain
- (S) Suspended
- (I) Ineligible
- (W) Walk-on
- Injured
- Current redshirt

== Schedule ==
Date time, TV	Rank^{#}	Opponent^{#}	Result	Record	High points	High rebounds	High assists	Site (attendance) city, state
Regular season
December 8, 1932*		at Princeton	L 27–36	0–1	–	–	–	Princeton, NJ
December 10, 1932*		Hampden–Sydney	W 33–29	1–1	14 – Kline	–	–	Curtis Hall Gym; Philadelphia, PA
January 7, 1933*		Philadelphia Osteopathic	L 27–41	1–2	–	–	–	Curtis Hall Gym; Philadelphia, PA
January 11, 1933		Lebanon Valley	L 32–42	1–3 (0–1)	–	–	–	Curtis Hall Gym; Philadelphia, PA
January 13, 1933		Franklin & Marshall	L 25–41	1–4 (0–2)	–	–	–	Curtis Hall Gym; Philadelphia, PA
January 17, 1933		at Albright	L 25–66	1–5 (0–3)	–	–	–	Reading YMCA; Reading, PA
January 20, 1933		Muhlenberg	L 35–44	1–6 (0–4)	–	–	–	Curtis Hall Gym; Philadelphia, PA
January 21, 1933*		Delaware	L 26–40	1–7	–	–	–	Curtis Hall Gym; Philadelphia, PA
Unknown*		West Chester	L 25–30	1–8	–	–	–	
February 3, 1933		at Lebanon Valley	L 33–37	1–9 (0–5)	–	–	–	
February 4, 1933		at Gettysburg	L 25–55	1–10 (0–6)	–	–	–	
February 7, 1933		Ursinus	L 36–37	1–11 (0–7)	–	–	–	Curtis Hall Gym; Philadelphia, PA
February 1933		at Muhlenberg	L 30–34	1–12 (0–8)	–	–	–	
February 17, 1933		at Franklin & Marshall	L 26–33	1–13 (0–9)	–	–	–	
February 20, 1933		Albright	L 29–47	1–14 (0–10)	–	–	–	Curtis Hall Gym; Philadelphia, PA
February 25, 1933		Gettysburg	L 28–44	1–15 (0–11)	–	–	–	Curtis Hall Gym; Philadelphia, PA
February 1933*		Juniata	W 45–38	2–15	–	–	–	
March 1, 1933		at Ursinus	L 36–41 ^{OT}	2–16 (0–12)	–	–	–	
*Non-conference game. ^{#}Rankings from AP. (#) Tournament seedings in parentheses. All times are in Eastern Time.
