= 1919–20 Drexel Blue and Gold men's basketball team =

American college basketball season

1919–20 Drexel Blue and Gold men's basketball
- Conference: Independent
- Record: –
- Head coach: James Barrett (2nd season)
- Home arena: Main Building

The 1919–20 Drexel Blue and Gold men's basketball team represented Drexel Institute of Art, Science and Industry during the 1919–20 men's basketball season. The Blue and Gold, led by 2nd year head coach James Barrett, played their home games at Main Building.

During this season, in a game against Saint Joseph's, Stanley Twoes made a total of 20 free throws, setting a school record.

== Roster ==
1919–20 Drexel Dragons men's basketball team
Players
Coaches

Pos.	#	Name	Height	Weight	Year	Previous school	Hometown
		W.H. Blessing	—	—
		Stanley Twoes	—	—

Head coach

- James Barrett

Assistant coach(es)

Legend

- (C) Team captain
- (S) Suspended
- (I) Ineligible
- (W) Walk-on
- Injured
- Current redshirt

== Schedule ==
Date time, TV	Rank^{#}	Opponent^{#}	Result	Record	High points	High rebounds	High assists	Site (attendance) city, state
Regular season
January 17, 1920*		Gallaudet	Cancelled					Main Building; Philadelphia, PA
February 20, 1920*		Franklin & Marshall	–					Main Building; Philadelphia, PA
February 20, 1920*		Washington (MD)	W 35–28	–	–	–	–	Main Building; Philadelphia, PA
March 5, 1920*		Moravian	W 32–31		–	–	–	Main Building; Philadelphia, PA
March 13, 1920*		at Moravian						Bethlehem, PA
Unknown*		Saint Joseph's	W 31–25		–	–	–	Main Building; Philadelphia, PA
Unknown*		at Saint Joseph's	L 17–26		–	–	–	
Unknown*		Muhlenberg						
Unknown*		St. John’s Military College	W –		–	–	–	
*Non-conference game. ^{#}Rankings from AP. (#) Tournament seedings in parentheses. All times are in Eastern Time.
