= 1908–09 Drexel Blue and Gold men's basketball team =

American college basketball season

1908–09 Drexel Blue and Gold men's basketball
- Conference: Independent
- Record: –
- Head coach: F. Bennett, G. Doughty
- Home arena: Main Building

The 1908–09 Drexel Blue and Gold men's basketball team represented Drexel Institute of Art, Science and Industry during the 1908–09 men's basketball season. The Blue and Gold, who were led by head coach F. Bennett at the beginning of the season until he was replaced by G. Doughty, played their home games at Main Building.

== Roster ==
1908–09 Drexel Dragons men's basketball team
Players
Coaches

Pos.	#	Name	Height	Weight	Year	Previous school	Hometown
		Ferron	—	—
		Maclary	—	—
			—	—

Head coach

- F. Bennett, G. Doughty

Assistant coach(es)

Legend

- (C) Team captain
- (S) Suspended
- (I) Ineligible
- (W) Walk-on
- Injured
- Current redshirt

== Schedule ==
Date time, TV	Rank^{#}	Opponent^{#}	Result	Record	High points	High rebounds	High assists	Site (attendance) city, state
Regular season
Unknown*		Bordentown Military Institute						
*Non-conference game. ^{#}Rankings from AP. (#) Tournament seedings in parentheses. All times are in Eastern Time.
