= 1950–51 Drexel Dragons men's basketball team =

American college basketball season

1950–51 Drexel Dragons men's basketball
- Conference: Middle Atlantic Conferences
- Southern
- Record: 5–12 (3–7 MAC)
- Head coach: Harold Kollar (2nd season)
- Captain: Alfred MacCart
- Home arena: Curtis Hall Gym

The 1950–51 Drexel Dragons men's basketball team represented Drexel Institute of Technology during the 1950–51 men's basketball season. The Dragons, led by 2nd year head coach Harold Kollar, played their home games at Curtis Hall Gym and were members of the Southern division of the Middle Atlantic Conferences (MAC).

They finished the season 5–12, 3–7 in MAC play to finish in fifth place in the regular season.

== Roster ==
1950–51 Drexel Dragons men's basketball team
Players
Coaches

| Pos. | # | Name | Height | Weight | Year | Previous school | Hometown |
|---|---|---|---|---|---|---|---|
| | 4 | Vincent Filliben | 6 ft 0 in (1.83 m) | — |
| | 5 | Edward Imperato | 5 ft 9 in (1.75 m) | — |
| F | 6 | Stan Laskus | 6 ft 0 in (1.83 m) | — | | John Bartram HS |
| C | 8 | Basil Barno | 6 ft 0 in (1.83 m) | — |
| | 9 | Bernard McNamee (injured) | 6 ft 2 in (1.88 m) | — |
| G | 10 | Alfred MacCart (C) | 5 ft 11 in (1.8 m) | — | Jr | John Bartram HS |
| | 11 | Karl Schaeffer | — | — |
| | 11 | George Seidel | — | — |
| | 12 | James Toner | — | — |
| | 12 | Morton Shafter | 6 ft 1 in (1.85 m) | — |
| G | 13 | Joe Skurla | 6 ft 1 in (1.85 m) | — | | Allentown HS |
| F | 16 | Bob Brewton | 6 ft 2 in (1.88 m) | — | | Central HS (PA) |
| F | 17 | Sid Kane | 6 ft 2 in (1.88 m) | — | | Northeast HS (PA) |
| | | Evans Morrison | — | — |
| | | Harry Wigand | — | — |

Head coach

- Harold Kollar (Drexel)

Assistant coach(es)

Legend

- (C) Team captain
- (S) Suspended
- (I) Ineligible
- (W) Walk-on
- Injured
- Current redshirt

== Schedule ==
| Date time, TV | Rank^{#} | Opponent^{#} | Result | Record | High points | High rebounds | High assists | Site (attendance) city, state |
Regular season
| January 6, 1951 | | Ursinus | L 74–80 | 0–1 (0–1) | 24 – Filliben | – | – | Curtis Hall Gym; Philadelphia, PA |
| January 10, 1951 | | vs. Swarthmore | L 47–51 | 0–2 (0–2) | 9 – Filliben | – | – | Palestra; Philadelphia, PA |
| January 13, 1951 | | at Delaware | L 49–50 | 0–3 (0–3) | 18 – MacCart | – | – | Newark, DE |
| January 17, 1951 | | at Haverford | W 78–63 | 1–3 (1–3) | 27 – MacCart | – | – | Ryan Gym; Haverford, PA |
| January 20, 1951* | | American | L 59–75 | 1–4 | 17 – MacCart | – | – | Curtis Hall Gym; Philadelphia, PA |
| January 24, 1951* | | West Chester | L 57–63 | 1–5 | 19 – MacCart | – | – | Curtis Hall Gym; Philadelphia, PA |
| January 27, 1951* | | at Juniata | W 65–50 | 2–5 | 18 – MacCart | – | – | |
| January 31, 1951* | | vs. Saint Joseph's | L 34–66 | 2–6 | 10 – Schafter | – | – | Palestra; Philadelphia, PA |
| February 3, 1951* | | Drexel Alumni | W 81–66 | | 19 – MacCart | – | – | Curtis Hall Gym; Philadelphia, PA |
| February 8, 1951* | | vs. Temple | L 51–60 | 2–7 | 22 – MacCart | – | – | Saint Joseph's Fieldhouse; Philadelphia, PA |
| February 10, 1951* | | at Stevens Tech | L 49–58 | 2–8 | 13 – Barno | – | – | |
| February 12, 1951* | | at Lehigh | W 75–70 | 3–8 | 25 – MacCart | – | – | |
| February 14, 1951 | | Pennsylvania Military College | L 55–73 | 3–9 (1–4) | 14 – Filliben | – | – | Curtis Hall Gym; Philadelphia, PA |
| February 17, 1951 | | Haverford | W 76–73 | 4–9 (2–4) | 23 – Brewton | – | – | Curtis Hall Gym; Philadelphia, PA |
| February 21, 1951 | | at Ursinus | L 70–74 | 4–10 (2–5) | 31 – MacCart | – | – | Collegeville, PA |
| February 24, 1951 | | at Swarthmore | L 64–67 | 4–11 (2–6) | 20 – MacCart | – | – | |
| February 28, 1951 | | Delaware | L 55–75 | 4–12 (2–7) | 26 – MacCart | – | – | Curtis Hall Gym; Philadelphia, PA |
| March 3, 1951 | | at Pennsylvania Military College | W 73–71 | 5–12 (3–7) | 20 – Filliben | – | – | Chester, PA |
*Non-conference game. ^{#}Rankings from AP. (#) Tournament seedings in parentheses. All times are in Eastern Time.
