= 1926–27 Drexel Engineers men's basketball team =

American college basketball season

1926–27 Drexel Engineers men's basketball
- Conference: Independent
- Record: –
- Head coach: Ernest Lange (2nd season)
- Captain: Joseph Foley
- Home arena: Main Building

The 1926–27 Drexel Engineers men's basketball team represented Drexel Institute of Art, Science and Industry during the 1926–27 men's basketball season. The Engineers, led by 2nd year head coach Ernest Lange, played their home games at Main Building.

== Roster ==
1926–27 Drexel Dragons men's basketball team
Players
Coaches

Pos.	#	Name	Height	Weight	Year	Previous school	Hometown
F		Christian Schwartz	—	—	Jr
G/F		Albert Hey	—	—	So	South Philadelphia HS
C		Fortin	—	—		Allentown Preparatory School
G		Joseph Foley (C)	—	—	Sr
G		Carl Gregory	—	—	Jr	Latrobe HS
C		Curtis Dobbins	—	—	Fr	Haddonfield Memorial HS	Haddonfield, NJ
F		Albert Tucker	—	—	Fr	Germantown HS	Philadelphia, PA
F		Custer	—	—	Fr
		Dawson	—	—
G		Davis	—	—

Head coach

- Ernest Lange (Wisconsin)

Assistant coach(es)

Legend

- (C) Team captain
- (S) Suspended
- (I) Ineligible
- (W) Walk-on
- Injured
- Current redshirt

== Schedule ==
Date time, TV	Rank^{#}	Opponent^{#}	Result	Record	High points	High rebounds	High assists	Site (attendance) city, state
Regular season
December 3, 1926*; 8:00 pm		Philadelphia Textile	L –	0–1	–	–	–	Main Building; Philadelphia, PA
December 4, 1926*		at Rutgers	L 27–30	0–2	10 – Schwartz	–	–	New Brunswick, NJ
December 11, 1926*; 8:30 pm		at Penn; Battle of 33rd Street	L 26–39		8 – Hey	–	–	Weightman Hall (2,000); Philadelphia, PA
January 8, 1927*; 8:00 pm		at Swarthmore	L 13–40		–	–	–	
January 12, 1927*		at Seton Hall	L 21–35		–	–	–	
January 15, 1927*; 8:00 pm		Haverford	L 38–39		9 – Tucker	–	–	Main Building; Philadelphia, PA
January 22, 1927*		Delaware	W 23–21		15 – Hey	–	–	Main Building; Philadelphia, PA
February 4, 1927*		Susquehanna	W 34–17		14 – Hey	–	–	Main Building; Philadelphia, PA
February 5, 1927*		at Muhlenberg	L 20–38		6 – Hey	–	–	Allentown, PA
February 10, 1927*		Juniata	L 22–38		7 – Schwartz	–	–	Main Building; Philadelphia, PA
February 12, 1927*		at Upsala	W 35–31		9 – Tied	–	–	
February 16, 1927*		Pennsylvania Military College	W 30–23		–	–	–	Main Building; Philadelphia, PA
February 19, 1927*		Seton Hall	W 28–25		10 – Schwartz	–	–	Main Building; Philadelphia, PA
February 25, 1927*		at Juniata	L 18–26		–	–	–	Huntingdon, PA
February 26, 1927*		at Susquehanna	W 28–26 ^{OT}		–	–	–	Selinsgrove, PA
March 2, 1927*; 4:00 pm		Upsala	W 30–28		10 – tied	–	–	Main Building; Philadelphia, PA
*Non-conference game. ^{#}Rankings from AP. (#) Tournament seedings in parentheses. All times are in Eastern Time.
