= 1941–42 Drexel Dragons men's basketball team =

American college basketball season

1941–42 Drexel Dragons men's basketball
- Conference: Independent
- Record: 9–5
- Head coach: Lawrence Mains (3rd season)
- Captain: Jack Gilliford
- Home arena: Curtis Hall Gym

The 1941–42 Drexel Dragons men's basketball team represented Drexel Institute of Technology during the 1941–42 men's basketball season. The Dragons, led by 3rd year head coach Lawrence Mains, played their home games at Curtis Hall Gym.

== Roster ==
1941–42 Drexel Dragons men's basketball team
Players	Coaches
Pos. / # / Name / Height / Weight / Year / Previous school / Hometown; G / / Jack Gilliford (C) / — / — / / Wayne, PA	Head coach: Lawrence Mains (Wisconsin); Assistant coach(es) Legend: (C) Team captain; (S) Suspended; (I) Ineligible; (W) Walk-on; Injured; Current redshirt

== Schedule ==
Date time, TV	Rank^{#}	Opponent^{#}	Result	Record	High points	High rebounds	High assists	Site (attendance) city, state
Regular season
January 3, 1942*		Hampden–Sydney	W 61–34	1–0	–	–	–	Curtis Hall Gym; Philadelphia, PA
January 10, 1942*		at Susquehanna	W 42–27	2–0	–	–	–	Selinsgrove, PA
January 14, 1942*		at Haverford	W 47–45	3–0	–	–	–	Ryan Gym; Haverford, PA
January 17, 1942*		Swarthmore	L 45–49	3–1	–	–	–	Curtis Hall Gym; Philadelphia, PA
January 20, 1942*		Juniata	L 32–47	3–2	–	–	–	Curtis Hall Gym; Philadelphia, PA
January 28, 1942*		at Johns Hopkins	L 30–34	3–3	–	–	–	
January 30, 1942*; 7:30 pm		Rensselaer	W 35–34	4–3	–	–	–	Curtis Hall Gym; Philadelphia, PA
February 5, 1942*		Delaware	W 46–36	5–3	–	–	–	Curtis Hall Gym; Philadelphia, PA
February 7, 1942*		Lafayette	W 39–32	6–3	–	–	–	Curtis Hall Gym; Philadelphia, PA
February 11, 1942*		Ursinus	Cancelled					
February 14, 1942*		Dickinson	W 43–42	7–3	–	–	–	Curtis Hall Gym; Philadelphia, PA
February 18, 1942*		Lehigh	L 37–55	7–4	–	–	–	
February 21, 1942*		Brooklyn Polytech	L 37–39	7–5	–	–	–	Curtis Hall Gym; Philadelphia, PA
February 25, 1942		Haverford	W 50–32	8–5	–	–	–	Curtis Hall Gym; Philadelphia, PA
February 28, 1942*		at Stevens Tech	W 33–29	9–5	–	–	–	Hoboken, NJ
March 5, 1942*		Ursinus	Cancelled					
*Non-conference game. ^{#}Rankings from AP. (#) Tournament seedings in parentheses. All times are in Eastern Time.
