= 1937–38 Drexel Dragons men's basketball team =

American college basketball season

1937–38 Drexel Dragons men's basketball
- Conference: Eastern Pennsylvania Collegiate Basketball League
- Record: 3–12 (1–11 EPCBL)
- Head coach: Ernest Lange (6th season)
- Home arena: Curtis Hall Gym

1937–38 EPCBL men's basketball standings
	Conf.				Overall
Team	W		L	PCT	W		L	PCT
Gettysburg	10	–	2	.833	13	–	5	.722
Lebanon Valley	9	–	3	.750		–		–
Muhlenberg	7	–	5	.583		–		–
Albright	6	–	6	.500		–		–
Ursinus	5	–	7	.417		–		–
Franklin & Marshall	4	–	8	.333	7	–	11	.389
Drexel	1	–	11	.083	3	–	12	.200

The 1937–38 Drexel Dragons men's basketball team represented Drexel Institute of Technology during the 1937–38 men's basketball season. The Dragons, led by 6th year head coach Ernest Lange, played their home games at Curtis Hall Gym and were members of the Eastern Pennsylvania Collegiate Basketball League (EPCBL).

== Roster ==
1937–38 Drexel Dragons men's basketball team
Players
Coaches

Pos.	#	Name	Height	Weight	Year	Previous school	Hometown
		Elwood Conard	—	—
		Joseph Lambert	—	—
C		Theodore "Ted" Layton (C)	—	—
		William Lignelli	—	—
		George Nanos	—	—
		Harry Wolf	—	—
		Richard Bennett	—	—
		Robert Hanna	—	—
		Joseph McCracken	—	—

Head coach

- Ernest Lange (Wisconsin)

Assistant coach(es)

Legend

- (C) Team captain
- (S) Suspended
- (I) Ineligible
- (W) Walk-on
- Injured
- Current redshirt

== Schedule ==
Date time, TV	Rank^{#}	Opponent^{#}	Result	Record	High points	High rebounds	High assists	Site (attendance) city, state
Regular season
January 6, 1938		at Franklin & Marshall	L 31–33	0–1 (0–1)	–	–	–	
January 8, 1938		Albright	L 25–27	0–2 (0–2)	–	–	–	Cutis Hall Gym; Philadelphia, PA
January 14, 1938		at Gettysburg	L 35–40	0–3 (0–3)	13 – Bennett	–	–	Gettysburg, PA
January 15, 1938		at Lebanon Valley	L 31–40	0–4 (0–4)	7 – Layton	–	–	Annville, PA
January 22, 1938*		at Swarthmore	L 27–38	0–5	8 – Layton	–	–	
January 29, 1938*		Susquehanna	W 40–34	1–5	12 – Tied	–	–	Curtis Hall Gym; Philadelphia, PA
February 2, 1938		at Muhlenberg	L 37–44	1–6 (0–5)	8 – Tied	–	–	William Allen High School; Allentown, PA
February 5, 1938		Franklin & Marshall	L 36–39	1–7 (0–6)	10 – Tied	–	–	Curtis Hall Gym; Philadelphia, PA
February 12, 1938		Gettysburg	L 30–40	1–8 (0–7)	6 – Tied	–	–	Curtis Hall Gym; Philadelphia, PA
February 16, 1938*		Brooklyn Polytech	W 39–34	2–8	15 – Wolf	–	–	Curtis Hall Gym; Philadelphia, PA
February 19, 1938		Lebanon Valley	L 44–57	2–9 (0–8)	–	–	–	Curtis Hall Gym; Philadelphia, PA
February 21, 1938		Ursinus	W 39–24	3–9 (1–8)	–	–	–	Curtis Hall Gym; Philadelphia, PA
February 26, 1938		at Albright	L 34–37	3–10 (1–9)	–	–	–	Reading, PA
March 2, 1938		at Ursinus	L 29–39	3–11 (1–10)	–	–	–	
March 4, 1938		Muhlenberg	L 31–46	3–12 (1–11)	10 – Nannos	–	–	Curtis Hall Gym; Philadelphia, PA
*Non-conference game. ^{#}Rankings from AP. (#) Tournament seedings in parentheses. All times are in Eastern Time.
