= 1949–50 Drexel Dragons men's basketball team =

American college basketball season

1949–50 Drexel Dragons men's basketball
- Conference: Middle Atlantic Conferences
- Southern
- Record: 11–5 (7–3 MAC)
- Head coach: Harold Kollar (1st season)
- Assistant coach: Bernard Rosenfield (1st season)
- Captain: Donald Breder
- Home arena: Curtis Hall Gym

The 1949–50 Drexel Dragons men's basketball team represented Drexel Institute of Technology during the 1949–50 men's basketball season. The Dragons, led by 1st year head coach Harold Kollar, played their home games at Curtis Hall Gym and were members of the Southern division of the Middle Atlantic Conferences (MAC).

== Roster ==
1949–50 Drexel Dragons men's basketball team
Players
Coaches

Pos.	#	Name	Height	Weight	Year	Previous school	Hometown
F	4	Vincent Filliben	—	—
C	11	John Savchak	6 ft 4.5 in (1.94 m)	—		John Bartram HS
C		Basil Barno	6 ft 3 in (1.91 m)	—
F		Bernard McNamee	—	—
F		Morton Shafter	6 ft 0 in (1.83 m)	—
G		Joe Skurla	6 ft 0 in (1.83 m)	—		Allentown HS
G		Bob Brewton	6 ft 2 in (1.88 m)	—		Central HS (PA)
F		Stan Laskus	—	—		John Bartram HS
G		Alfred MacCart	5 ft 11 in (1.8 m)	—	So	John Bartram HS
F		Donald Breder (C)	6 ft 2 in (1.88 m)	—
G		Bill Banks	5 ft 9 in (1.75 m)	—
C		Roy Wagner	6 ft 4 in (1.93 m)	—
F		Sid Kane	—	—		Northeast HS (PA)

Head coach

- Harold Kollar (Drexel)

Assistant coach(es)

- Bernard Rosenfield(Drexel)

Legend

- (C) Team captain
- (S) Suspended
- (I) Ineligible
- (W) Walk-on
- Injured
- Current redshirt

Roster

== Schedule ==
Date time, TV	Rank^{#}	Opponent^{#}	Result	Record	High points	High rebounds	High assists	Site (attendance) city, state
Regular season
January 7, 1950*		Stevens Tech	W 63–48	1–0	16 – MacCart	–	–	Curtis Hall Gym; Philadelphia, PA
January 10, 1950*		Lehigh	W 58–53	2–0	12 – MacCart	–	–	Curtis Hall Gym; Philadelphia, PA
January 14, 1950		at Swarthmore	W 71–60	3–0 (1–0)	15 – Breder	–	–	Lamb-Miller Field House; Swarthmore, PA
January 18, 1950		at Haverford	W 79–68	4–0 (2–0)	22 – Savchak	–	–	Ryan Gym; Haverford, PA
January 21, 1950		at Pennsylvania Military College	L 54–56	4–1 (2–1)	23 – Filliben	–	–	Chester, PA
January 25, 1950*		Philadelphia Textile	W 76–59	5–1	13 – Wagner	–	–	Curtis Hall Gym; Philadelphia, PA
February 1, 1950*		at Saint Joseph's	Postponed to March 8 (Illness)					
February 4, 1950*		at American	L 44–68	5–2	9 – Savchak	–	–	Washington, D.C.
February 8, 1950		at Delaware	L 45–51	5–3 (2–2)	12 – MacCart	–	–	Newark, DE
February 11, 1950		Ursinus	W 71–60	6–3 (3–2)	–	–	–	Curtis Hall Gym; Philadelphia, PA
February 16, 1950*		Juniata	W 64–37	7–3	–	–	–	Curtis Hall Gym; Philadelphia, PA
February 18, 1950		Haverford	W 61–49	8–3 (4–2)	–	–	–	Curtis Hall Gym; Philadelphia, PA
February 21, 1950		Swarthmore	L 54–61	8–4 (4–3)	–	–	–	Palestra; Philadelphia, PA
February 25, 1950		at Ursinus	W 68–67	9–4 (5–3)	–	–	–	
February 28, 1950		Pennsylvania Military College	W 62–54	10–4 (6–3)	–	–	–	Palestra; Philadelphia, PA
March 6, 1950		Delaware	W 65–62	11–4 (7–3)	–	–	–	Curtis Hall Gym; Philadelphia, PA
March 8, 1950*		at Saint Joseph's	L 51–68	11–5	–	–	–	
*Non-conference game. ^{#}Rankings from AP. (#) Tournament seedings in parentheses. All times are in Eastern Time.
