= 1905–06 Drexel Blue and Gold men's basketball team =

American college basketball season

1905–06 Drexel Blue and Gold men's basketball
- Conference: Independent (collegiate), Philadelphia Interscholastic League
- Record: 11–4 (– PIL)
- Head coach: Walter S. Brokaw (1st season)
- Captain: Frank Griffin
- Home arena: Main Building

The 1905–06 Drexel Blue and Gold men's basketball team represented Drexel Institute of Art, Science and Industry during the 1905–06 men's basketball season. The Blue and Gold, led by first year head coach Walter S. Brokaw, who graduated from Drexel in 1905, played their home games at Main Building.

== Roster ==
1905–06 Drexel Dragons men's basketball team
Players
Coaches

Pos.	#	Name	Height	Weight	Year	Previous school	Hometown
		Frank Griffin (C)	—	—
		Hitchen	—	—
		Frazee	—	—
		Fell	—	—
		Miller	—	—
		Hansell	—	—
		Richardson	—	—
		Kirby	—	—
		MacIntire	—	—
		Storms	—	—
		Thropp	—	—
		Remington	—	—
		McCausland	—	—
		Gray	—	—
		J. Kugler	—	—

Head coach

- Walter S. Brokaw (Drexel)

Assistant coach(es)

Legend

- (C) Team captain
- (S) Suspended
- (I) Ineligible
- (W) Walk-on
- Injured
- Current redshirt

== Schedule ==
Date time, TV	Rank^{#}	Opponent^{#}	Result	Record	High points	High rebounds	High assists	Site (attendance) city, state
Regular season
December 12, 1905		vs. Brown Prep (PA)	W 28–17	(1–0)	–	–	–	St. James Hall; Philadelphia, PA
December 15, 1905		vs. Northeast Manual Training School	L 13–17	(1–1)	–	–	–	St. James Hall; Philadelphia, PA
January 5, 1906		vs. Central High School	L 15–19	(1–2)	–	–	–	St. James Hall; Philadelphia, PA
January 9, 1906		vs. Phillips Brooks	W 23–13	(2–2)	–	–	–	St. James Hall; Philadelphia, PA
January 16, 1906		vs. Central Manual Trade School; Postponed to January 19						St. James Hall; Philadelphia, PA
January 17, 1906*		vs. Friends' Central School; Rescheduled from ?	W 23–14	(3–2)	–	–	–	St. James Hall; Philadelphia, PA
January 19, 1906*		vs. Central Manual Trade School	W Forfeit	(4–2)	–	–	–	St. James Hall; Philadelphia, PA
January 20, 1906*		West Jersey Academy	W 49–33		–	–	–	
January 30, 1906		vs. Cheltenham Academy	W 57–10		–	–	–	St. James Hall; Philadelphia, PA
February 2, 1906		vs. Friends' Central School; Postponed to February 23						St. James Hall; Philadelphia, PA
February 3, 1906*		Woodbury	W 38–23		–	–	–	
February 13, 1906		vs. Central Manual Trade School; Postponed to February 26						St. James Hall; Philadelphia, PA
February 16, 1906		vs. Northeast Manual Training School; Postponed						St. James Hall; Philadelphia, PA
February 16, 1906		vs. Brown Prep (PA)	W 42–9		–	–	–	St. James Hall; Philadelphia, PA
February 17, 1906		vs. Williamson Trade School	W 25–21		–	–	–	St. James Hall; Philadelphia, PA
February 23, 1906		vs. Friends' Central School	W 41–8		–	–	–	St. James Hall; Philadelphia, PA
February 26, 1906		vs. Central Manual Trade School	W 17–15		–	–	–	St. James Hall; Philadelphia, PA
March 2, 1906		vs. Central High School						St. James Hall; Philadelphia, PA
March 5, 1906		vs. Phillips Brooks						St. James Hall; Philadelphia, PA
March 7, 1906		vs. Friends' Central School						St. James Hall; Philadelphia, PA
March 10, 1906		vs. West Chester						St. James Hall; Philadelphia, PA
March 14, 1906		vs. Cheltenham Academy						St. James Hall; Philadelphia, PA
March 21, 1906*		vs. St. Paul’s Guild	L		–	–	–	St. James Hall; Philadelphia, PA
Unknown*		Temple	W 27–19		–	–	–	
*Non-conference game. ^{#}Rankings from AP. (#) Tournament seedings in parentheses. All times are in Eastern Time.
