= 1900–01 Drexel Blue and Gold men's basketball team =

American college basketball season

1900–01 Drexel Blue and Gold men's basketball
- Conference: Independent (collegiate), Philadelphia Interscholastic League
- Record: – (– PIL)
- Head coach: No coach
- Home arena: Main Building

The 1900–01 Drexel Blue and Gold men's basketball team represented Drexel Institute of Art, Science and Industry during the 1900–01 men's basketball season. The Blue and Gold, who played without a head coach, played their home games at Main Building.

== Roster ==
1900–01 Drexel Dragons men's basketball team
Players	Coaches
Pos. / # / Name / Height / Weight / Year / Previous school / Hometown; / / Bacon / — / —	Head coach: No coach; Assistant coach(es) Legend: (C) Team captain; (S) Suspended; (I) Ineligible; (W) Walk-on; Injured; Current redshirt

== Schedule ==
Date time, TV	Rank^{#}	Opponent^{#}	Result	Record	High points	High rebounds	High assists	Site (attendance) city, state
Regular season
December 10, 1900		at Brown Prep	W –		–	–	–	St. James Hall; Philadelphia, PA
December 1900		Roman Catholic High School	W 20–16		–	–	–	St. James Hall; Philadelphia, PA
February 11, 1901		Central High School	W 22–17	–	–	–	–	St. James Hall; Philadelphia, PA
February 15, 1901*		at Saint Joseph's Prep						St. James Hall; Philadelphia, PA
March 13, 1901*		at Princeton	L 16–17		–	–	–	
*Non-conference game. ^{#}Rankings from AP. (#) Tournament seedings in parentheses. All times are in Eastern Time.
