= 1916–17 Drexel Blue and Gold men's basketball team =

American college basketball season

1916–17 Drexel Blue and Gold men's basketball
- Conference: Independent
- Record: –
- Head coach: E.L. Lucas (3rd season)
- Captain: Ernest Calhoun
- Home arena: Main Building

The 1916–17 Drexel Blue and Gold men's basketball team represented the Drexel Institute of Art, Science and Industry during the 1916–17 men's basketball season. Led by 3rd-year head coach E.L. Lucas, the Blue and Gold played their home games at Main Building.

== Roster ==
1916–17 Drexel Dragons men's basketball team
Players
Coaches

Pos.	#	Name	Height	Weight	Year	Previous school	Hometown
F		Herbert Eves	—	—	So
		Ernest Calhoun (C)	—	—	Sr
F		Ratcliffe	—	—
		A. S. Mahan	—	—
		Probasco	—	—
		Blessing	—	—
		Pearson	—	—
		Watkins	—	—
		Osmond	—	—

Head coach

- E.L. Lucas

Assistant coach(es)

Legend

- (C) Team captain
- (S) Suspended
- (I) Ineligible
- (W) Walk-on
- Injured
- Current redshirt

== Schedule ==
Date time, TV	Rank^{#}	Opponent^{#}	Result	Record	High points	High rebounds	High assists	Site (attendance) city, state
Regular season
February 7, 1917*		at Delaware	L 18–35		–	–	–	Taylor Gym; Newark, DE
Unknown*		Pratt	L –	–	–	–	–	
February 23, 1917*		Pratt	L 27–32	–	–	–	–	Main Building; Philadelphia, PA
March 2, 1917*		Lebanon Valley	L 32–39		18 – Ratcliffe	–	–	Main Building; Philadelphia, PA
Unknown*		Lehigh	L 10–48		–	–	–	
March 16, 1917*		Johns Hopkins	W 33–31 ^{OT}		–	–	–	
*Non-conference game. ^{#}Rankings from AP. (#) Tournament seedings in parentheses. All times are in Eastern Time.
