= 1902–03 Drexel Blue and Gold men's basketball team =

American college basketball season

1902–03 Drexel Blue and Gold men's basketball
- Conference: Independent
- Record: –
- Head coach: No coach
- Home arena: Main Building

The 1902–03 Drexel Blue and Gold men's basketball team represented Drexel Institute of Art, Science and Industry during the 1902–03 men's basketball season. The Blue and Gold, who played without a head coach, played their home games at Main Building.

== Roster ==
1902–03 Drexel Dragons men's basketball team
Players	Coaches
Pos. / # / Name / Height / Weight / Year / Previous school / Hometown; / / / — / —	Head coach: No coach; Assistant coach(es) Legend: (C) Team captain; (S) Suspended; (I) Ineligible; (W) Walk-on; Injured; Current redshirt

== Schedule ==
Date time, TV	Rank^{#}	Opponent^{#}	Result	Record	High points	High rebounds	High assists	Site (attendance) city, state
Regular season
November 20, 1902* afternoon		at South Jersey Institute						Bridgeton, NJ
November 20, 1902* evening		Cohanzick Athletic Association						Bridgeton, NJ
Unknown*		Temple	W 21–10		–	–	–	
Unknown*		West Chester						
*Non-conference game. ^{#}Rankings from AP. (#) Tournament seedings in parentheses. All times are in Eastern Time.
