= 1910–11 Drexel Blue and Gold men's basketball team =

American college basketball season

1910–11 Drexel Blue and Gold men's basketball
- Conference: Independent
- Record: –
- Head coach: Frank Griffin (1st season)
- Home arena: Main Building

The 1910–11 Drexel Blue and Gold men's basketball team represented Drexel Institute of Art, Science and Industry during the 1910–11 men's basketball season. The Blue and Gold, led by 1st year head coach Frank Griffin, played their home games at Main Building.

== Roster ==
1910–11 Drexel Dragons men's basketball team
| Players | Coaches |
|---|---|
| Pos. / # / Name / Height / Weight / Year / Previous school / Hometown; / / Fulton / — / — | Head coach: No coach; Assistant coach(es) Legend: (C) Team captain; (S) Suspended; (I) Ineligible; (W) Walk-on; Injured; Current redshirt |

== Schedule ==
| Date time, TV | Rank^{#} | Opponent^{#} | Result | Record | High points | High rebounds | High assists | Site (attendance) city, state |
Regular season
| Unknown* | | Bryn Athyn | W – | | – | – | – | |
| Unknown* | | George School | L – | | – | – | – | |
| Unknown* | | Haverford School | L 27–36 | | – | – | – | |
| Unknown* | | Williamson Trade School | | | | | | |
*Non-conference game. ^{#}Rankings from AP. (#) Tournament seedings in parentheses. All times are in Eastern Time.
