= 1907–08 Drexel Blue and Gold men's basketball team =

American college basketball season

1907–08 Drexel Blue and Gold men's basketball
- Conference: Independent
- Record: –
- Head coach: Walter S. Brokaw, F. Bennett
- Home arena: Main Building

The 1907–08 Drexel Blue and Gold men's basketball team represented Drexel Institute of Art, Science and Industry during the 1907–08 men's basketball season. The Blue and Gold, who were led by head coach Walter S. Brokaw at the beginning of the season until he was replaced by F. Bennett, played their home games at Main Building.

== Roster ==
1907–08 Drexel Dragons men's basketball team
Players	Coaches
Pos. / # / Name / Height / Weight / Year / Previous school / Hometown; / / J. Kugler / — / —	Head coach: Walter S. Brokaw, F. Bennett; Assistant coach(es) Legend: (C) Team captain; (S) Suspended; (I) Ineligible; (W) Walk-on; Injured; Current redshirt

== Schedule ==
Date time, TV	Rank^{#}	Opponent^{#}	Result	Record	High points	High rebounds	High assists	Site (attendance) city, state
Regular season
January 31, 1908*		Central Manual Trade School						
February 1, 1908*		at Pennington Seminary	L 18–75		–	–	–	Pennington, NJ
Unknown*		Temple	W 35–18		–	–	–	
Unknown*		Central High School (PA)	L –		–	–	–	
Unknown*		Friends' Central School						
Unknown*		George School	L –		–	–	–	
Unknown*		Northeast Manual Training School						
Unknown*		Roman Catholic High School						
Unknown*		St. Paul’s Guild						
February 29, 1908*		at Pennsylvania Military College	L 32-27		–	–	–	
*Non-conference game. ^{#}Rankings from AP. (#) Tournament seedings in parentheses. All times are in Eastern Time.
