= 1911–12 Drexel Blue and Gold men's basketball team =

American college basketball season

1911–12 Drexel Blue and Gold men's basketball
- Conference: Independent
- Record: –
- Head coach: Frank Griffin (2nd season)
- Home arena: Main Building

The 1911–12 Drexel Blue and Gold men's basketball team represented Drexel Institute of Art, Science and Industry during the 1911–12 men's basketball season. The Blue and Gold, led by 2nd year head coach Frank Griffin, played their home games at Main Building.

== Roster ==
1911–12 Drexel Dragons men's basketball team
Players
Coaches

Pos.	#	Name	Height	Weight	Year	Previous school	Hometown
		Fulton	—	—
		Evans	—	—
		J. Stock	—	—
		Day	—	—
		Morlock	—	—

Head coach

- No coach

Assistant coach(es)

Legend

- (C) Team captain
- (S) Suspended
- (I) Ineligible
- (W) Walk-on
- Injured
- Current redshirt

== Schedule ==
Date time, TV	Rank^{#}	Opponent^{#}	Result	Record	High points	High rebounds	High assists	Site (attendance) city, state
Regular season
January 6, 1912*		at Catholic University						
January 13, 1912*		at Delaware	W 28–24		–	–	–	Taylor Gym; Newark, DE
February 24, 1912*		at Mount St. Mary's	L 12–31		4 – 3 tied	–	–	Emmitsburg, MD
Unknown*		Philadelphia Pharmacy	W –		–	–	–	
Unknown*		Philadelphia Textile						
Unknown*		Pratt						
Unknown*		Brown Prep						
Unknown*		Philadelphia Osteopathic	W –		–	–	–	
Unknown*		Haverford School						
Unknown*		Perkiomen School						
Unknown*		Williamson Trade School						
*Non-conference game. ^{#}Rankings from AP. (#) Tournament seedings in parentheses. All times are in Eastern Time.
