= 1943–44 Drexel Dragons men's basketball team =

American college basketball season

1943–44 Drexel Dragons men's basketball
- Conference: Independent
- Record: 4–5
- Head coach: John Marino (1st season)
- Captain: Ed Stier
- Home arena: Curtis Hall Gym

The 1943–44 Drexel Dragons men's basketball team represented Drexel Institute of Technology during the 1943–44 men's basketball season. The Dragons, led by 1st year head coach John Marino, played their home games at Curtis Hall Gym.

Due to wartime, the Drexel varsity men's basketball team was replaced with the Drexel men's junior varsity (or "frosh") team. This team is presumed to be the Drexel Dragons men's basketball team for the 1943–44 season for record keeping purposes. Following the season, it was expected that most, if not all, of the players from this team, including the head coach, would ever return to the team again due to joining the armed forces in World War II. The schedule for the season was essentially made as the season went on, with few games scheduled before the season began.

During the season, a mixed team of civilians and cadets (3318th S.U.) that were stationed on the Drexel University campus formed, called the Drexel ASTU. The team attempted to form the previous season, however had trouble composing a schedule when they learned they would only be allowed to face teams that were also ASTP teams. This team was coached by Maury McMains, who was the director of the physical training program for the cadets. When McMains was unavailable, Gene Carney (A-3) assumed coaching responsibilities as a player-coach. While the team was at a disadvantage due to a lack of practice, members of the team included former college basketball players and other experienced basketball players. The Drexel ASTU men left the campus in April after being recalled.

== Roster ==
=== Drexel J.V. Team ===
1943–44 Drexel Dragons men's basketball team
Players
Coaches

Pos.	#	Name	Height	Weight	Year	Previous school	Hometown
F		Ed Stier (C)	—	—	Fr
F	5	Norm Cassey	—	—	Fr
F	11	Earl Rohm	—	—	Fr
F		Stier	—	—	Fr
F		McHale	—	—	Fr
C		E.J. Hopkins	—	—	Fr
G	10	Leon Dumont	—	—	Fr
G	14	Larry Tecosky	—	—	Fr
G	12	Reds Sobel	—	—	Fr
G		Rothbaum	—	—	Fr
G		Kaplan	—	—	Fr
C		Judd Williams	—	—	Fr
C		Brown Hill	—	—	Fr
F		W. Fernon	—	—	Fr

Head coach

- John Marino

Assistant coach(es)

Legend

- (C) Team captain
- (S) Suspended
- (I) Ineligible
- (W) Walk-on
- Injured
- Current redshirt

=== Drexel ASTU ===
1943–44 Drexel Dragons men's basketball team
Players
Coaches

Pos.	#	Name	Height	Weight	Year	Previous school	Hometown
F		Gene Carney (C)	—	—
G		John Cannon	—	—
		George Benning	—	—
G		Harold Westfall	—	—
F		Harry Taylor	—	—
C		Warren Topp	—	—
		Richard Swanson	—	—
		Paul Franson	—	—
		Charles Randall	—	—
		Robert Hill	—	—
		George Woods	—	—
		Archie Twito	—	—
		Lest Roby	—	—
		Jacob White	—	—
		Robert Phillips	—	—

Head coach

- Maury McMains (McDaniel)

Assistant coach(es)

Gene Carney

Legend

- (C) Team captain
- (S) Suspended
- (I) Ineligible
- (W) Walk-on
- Injured
- Current redshirt

== Schedule ==
=== Drexel J.V. Team ===
Date time, TV	Rank^{#}	Opponent^{#}	Result	Record	High points	High rebounds	High assists	Site (attendance) city, state
Regular season
Unknown*		at Swarthmore J.V.	L 23–36	0–1	–	–	–	
Unknown*		vs. Drexel ASTU	L 24–29	0–2	–	–	–	Curtis Hall Gym; Philadelphia, PA
January 1944*		at Pennsylvania Military College	W 55–47	1–2	–	–	–	Hyatt Armory; Chester, PA
Unknown*; 3:30 pm		Penn V-12	W 37–36	2–2	13 – Williams	–	–	Curtis Hall Gym; Philadelphia, PA
January 1944*; 7:30 pm		Haverford Army Air Corps (Haverford ASTU)	L 37–49	2–3	–	–	–	Curtis Hall Gym; Philadelphia, PA
February 3, 1944*		at Haverford Army Air Corps (Haverford ASTU)	L 31–46	2–4	10 – Stier	–	–	Haverford Field House
February 12, 1944*		Pennsylvania Military College	W 42–38	3–4	12 – Stier	–	–	Curtis Hall Gym; Philadelphia, PA
February 12, 1944*; 8:00 pm		Naval Air Material Center	W 46–24	4–4	11 – Stier	–	–	Curtis Hall Gym; Philadelphia, PA
Unknown*		vs. Drexel ASTU	L 38–44	4–5	20 – Dumont	–	–	Curtis Hall Gym; Philadelphia, PA
*Non-conference game. ^{#}Rankings from AP. (#) Tournament seedings in parentheses. All times are in Eastern Time.

=== Drexel ASTU ===
Date time, TV	Rank^{#}	Opponent^{#}	Result	Record	High points	High rebounds	High assists	Site (attendance) city, state
Regular season
Unknown*		vs. Drexel	W 29–24	1–0	–	–	–	Curtis Hall Gym; Philadelphia, PA
January 29, 1944*; 4:00 pm		Penn V-12	W 45–32	2–0	22 – Carney	–	–	Curtis Hall Gym; Philadelphia, PA
February 5, 1944*; 8:00 pm		Haverford Army Air Corps (Haverford ASTU)	W 30–29	3–0	10 – Carney	–	–	Curtis Hall Gym; Philadelphia, PA
February 12, 1944*		Naval Aviation Supply Depot	W 38–32	4–0	10 – Tied	–	–	Curtis Hall Gym; Philadelphia, PA
February 1944*		Naval Air Material Center	L 44–50	4–1	–	–	–	
February 1944*		at Haverford Army Air Corps (Haverford ASTU)	L 34–56	4–2	–	–	–	Haverford Field House
Unknown*		vs. Drexel	W 44–38	5–2	18 – Carney	–	–	Curtis Hall Gym; Philadelphia, PA
March 1944*		Naval Air Material Center	L –	5–3	– Carney	–	–	
*Non-conference game. ^{#}Rankings from AP. (#) Tournament seedings in parentheses. All times are in Eastern Time.
