= 1931–32 Drexel Dragons men's basketball team =

Pennsylvanian basketball team

1931–32 Drexel Dragons men's basketball
- Conference: Eastern Pennsylvania Collegiate Basketball League
- Record: 10–7 (5–7 EPCBL)
- Head coach: Walter Halas (5th season)
- Captain: Al Ecklemeyer
- Home arena: Curtis Hall Gym

1931–32 EPCBL men's basketball standings
	Conf.				Overall
Team	W		L	PCT	W		L	PCT
Gettysburg	10	–	2	.833		–		–
Lebanon Valley	8	–	4	.667	11	–	6	.647
Franklin & Marshall	8	–	4	.667	9	–	7	.563
Drexel	5	–	7	.417	10	–	7	.588
Albright	5	–	7	.417		–		–
Muhlenberg	3	–	9	.250		–		–
Ursinus	3	–	9	.250		–		–

The 1931–32 Drexel Dragons men's basketball team represented Drexel Institute of Art, Science and Industry during the 1931–32 men's basketball season. The Dragons, led by 5th year head coach Walter Halas, played their home games at Curtis Hall Gym and were members of the Eastern Pennsylvania Collegiate Basketball League (EPCBL).

== Roster ==
1931–32 Drexel Dragons men's basketball team
Players
Coaches

Pos.	#	Name	Height	Weight	Year	Previous school	Hometown
		John Johnson	—	—	Sr
G		Henry Wallace	—	—	Fr
		Elmer Cook	—	—
		Bishop	—	—
F		Bill Johnson (injured)	—	—	Jr
G		Al Eckelmeyer (C)	—	—	Sr	Northeast HS (PA)	Philadelphia, PA
		Chuck Bublitz	—	—			Trenton, NJ

Head coach

- Walter Halas (Illinois)

Assistant coach(es)

Legend

- (C) Team captain
- (S) Suspended
- (I) Ineligible
- (W) Walk-on
- Injured
- Current redshirt

== Schedule ==
Date time, TV	Rank^{#}	Opponent^{#}	Result	Record	High points	High rebounds	High assists	Site (attendance) city, state
Regular season
Unknown*		Philadelphia Textile	W –	1–0	–	–	–	
January 9, 1932*		Philadelphia Osteopathic	W 29–28	2–0	12 – Bublitz	–	–	Curtis Hall Gym; Philadelphia, PA
January 13, 1932		at Franklin & Marshall	L 29–36	2–1 (0–1)	8 – Johnson	–	–	Lancaster, PA
January 1932		Albright	W 41–22	3–1 (1–1)	–	–	–	Curtis Hall Gym; Philadelphia, PA
January 20, 1932*		Juniata	W 44–43	4–1	–	–	–	Curtis Hall Gym; Philadelphia, PA
January 23, 1932		at Lebanon Valley	L 37–47	4–2 (1–2)	–	–	–	Annville, PA
January 29, 1932		at Gettysburg	L 31–44	4–3 (1–3)	–	–	–	Gettysburg, PA
January 30, 1932		at Albright	L 36–42	4–4 (1–4)	–	–	–	Reading YMCA; Reading, PA
February 1, 1932		Lebanon Valley	W 39–37	5–4 (2–4)	–	–	–	Curtis Hall Gym; Philadelphia, PA
February 5, 1932		Gettysburg	W 29–24	6–4 (3–4)	–	–	–	Curtis Hall Gym; Philadelphia, PA
February 10, 1932		at Ursinus	L 38–45	6–5 (3–5)	–	–	–	Collegeville, PA
February 13, 1932; 8:15 pm		Franklin & Marshall	L 20–35	6–6 (3–6)	–	–	–	Curtis Hall Gym; Philadelphia, PA
February 16, 1932*		at Haverford	W 35–33	7–6	–	–	–	Ryan Gym; Haverford, PA
February 19, 1932		Muhlenberg	W 33–29	8–6 (4–6)	14 – Bublitz	–	–	Curtis Hall Gym; Philadelphia, PA
February 24, 1932*		at Pennsylvania Military College	W –	9–6	–	–	–	Chester, PA
February 27, 1932		at Muhlenberg	L 22–32	9–7 (4–7)	14 – Bublitz	–	–	
March 2, 1932		Ursinus	W 36–33	10–7 (5–7)	–	–	–	Curtis Hall Gym; Philadelphia, PA
*Non-conference game. ^{#}Rankings from AP. (#) Tournament seedings in parentheses. All times are in Eastern Time.
