= 1942–43 Drexel Dragons men's basketball team =

American college basketball season

1942–43 Drexel Dragons men's basketball
- Conference: Independent
- Record: 12–3
- Head coach: Lawrence Mains (4th season)
- Captain: Erv Harden
- Home arena: Curtis Hall Gym

The 1942–43 Drexel Dragons men's basketball team represented Drexel Institute of Technology during the 1941–42 men's basketball season. The Dragons, led by 4th year head coach Lawrence Mains, played their home games at Curtis Hall Gym.

== Roster ==
1942–43 Drexel Dragons men's basketball team
Players
Coaches

Pos.	#	Name	Height	Weight	Year	Previous school	Hometown
		Erv Harden (C)	—	—
			—	—

Head coach

- Lawrence Mains (Wisconsin)

Assistant coach(es)

Legend

- (C) Team captain
- (S) Suspended
- (I) Ineligible
- (W) Walk-on
- Injured
- Current redshirt

== Schedule ==
Date time, TV	Rank^{#}	Opponent^{#}	Result	Record	High points	High rebounds	High assists	Site (attendance) city, state
Regular season
January 9, 1943*		Susquehanna	W 32–26	1–0	–	–	–	Curtis Hall Gym; Philadelphia, PA
January 16, 1943*		Pennsylvania Military College	W 36–31	2–0	–	–	–	Curtis Hall Gym (500); Philadelphia, PA
January 20, 1943*		at Swarthmore	W 50–37	3–0	–	–	–	
January 23, 1943*		at Rensselaer	W 44–34	4–0	–	–	–	Robison Gym; Troy, NY
January 29, 1943*		at Delaware	L 30–32	4–1	–	–	–	Newark, DE
January 30, 1943*		at Dickinson	L 46–48	4–2	10 – Tied	–	–	
February 4, 1943*		at Haverford	W 74–37	5–2	–	–	–	Ryan Gym; Haverford, PA
February 6, 1943*		at Lafayette	L 43–57	5–3	–	–	–	Easton, PA
February 10, 1943*		Stevens Tech	W 57–41	6–3	–	–	–	Curtis Hall Gym; Philadelphia, PA
February 13, 1943*		Lehigh	W 43–33	7–3	12 – Harden	–	–	Curtis Hall Gym; Philadelphia, PA
February 20, 1943*		Johns Hopkins	W 78–20	8–3	–	–	–	Curtis Hall Gym; Philadelphia, PA
February 24, 1943*		Swarthmore	W 53–32	9–3	–	–	–	Curtis Hall Gym; Philadelphia, PA
February 27, 1943*		at Brooklyn Polytech	W 49–41	10–3	–	–	–	
March 2, 1943*		at Pennsylvania Military College	W ?–43	11–3	–	–	–	Chester, PA
March 3, 1943*		Haverford	W 63–44	12–3	–	–	–	Curtis Hall Gym; Philadelphia, PA
*Non-conference game. ^{#}Rankings from AP. (#) Tournament seedings in parentheses. All times are in Eastern Time.
