= 1933–34 Drexel Dragons men's basketball team =

American college basketball season

1933–34 Drexel Dragons men's basketball
- Conference: Eastern Pennsylvania Collegiate Basketball League
- Record: 4–12 (2–10 EPCBL)
- Head coach: Walter Halas (7th season)
- Home arena: Curtis Hall Gym

1933–34 EPCBL men's basketball standings
| | Conf. | | | | Overall |
| Team | W | | L | PCT | W | | L | PCT |
|---|---|---|---|---|---|---|---|---|
| Gettysburg | 11 | – | 1 | .917 | | – | | – |
| Franklin & Marshall | 8 | – | 4 | .667 | 9 | – | 5 | .643 |
| Muhlenberg | 7 | – | 5 | .583 | | – | | – |
| Lebanon Valley | 6 | – | 6 | .500 | | – | | – |
| Albright | 5 | – | 7 | .417 | | – | | – |
| Ursinus | 3 | – | 9 | .250 | | – | | – |
| Drexel | 2 | – | 10 | .167 | 4 | – | 12 | .250 |

The 1933–34 Drexel Dragons men's basketball team represented Drexel Institute of Art, Science and Industry during the 1933–34 men's basketball season. The Dragons, led by 7th year head coach Walter Halas, played their home games at Curtis Hall Gym and were members of the Eastern Pennsylvania Collegiate Basketball League (EPCBL).

== Roster ==
1933–34 Drexel Dragons men's basketball team
Players
Coaches

| Pos. | # | Name | Height | Weight | Year | Previous school | Hometown |
|---|---|---|---|---|---|---|---|
| G | | Henry Wallace | — | — | Jr |
| | | Mered Hoff | — | — |
| | | Walter Kline | — | — |
| | | Charles Shupis | — | — |
| | | Charles Knapp | — | — |

Head coach

- Walter Halas (Illinois)

Assistant coach(es)

Legend

- (C) Team captain
- (S) Suspended
- (I) Ineligible
- (W) Walk-on
- Injured
- Current redshirt

== Schedule ==
| Date time, TV | Rank^{#} | Opponent^{#} | Result | Record | High points | High rebounds | High assists | Site (attendance) city, state |
Regular season
| December 8 1933* | | at Brooklyn Polytech | W 35–32 | 1–0 | – | – | – | Odd Fellows Hall; New York, NY |
| January 6, 1934* | | Philadelphia Osteopathic | L 39–42 | 1–1 | – | – | – | Curtis Hall Gym; Philadelphia, PA |
| January 10, 1934 | | Lebanon Valley | L 37–42 | 1–2 (0–1) | – | – | – | Curtis Hall Gym; Philadelphia, PA |
| January 12, 1934 | | at Albright | L 15–34 | 1–3 (0–2) | – | – | – | Reading YMCA; Reading, PA |
| January 17, 1934 | | at Muhlenberg | L 19–32 | 1–4 (0–3) | – | – | – | Allentown High School; Allentown, PA |
| January 20, 1934 | | Gettysburg | L 22–41 | 1–5 (0–4) | – | – | – | Curtis Hall Gym; Philadelphia, PA |
| January 23, 1934 | | at Franklin & Marshall | W 37–33 | 2–5 (1–4) | 10 – Wallace | – | – | Lancaster, PA |
| January 1934* | | at West Chester | L 20–34 | 2–6 | 8 – Knapp | – | – | Ehinger Gym; West Chester, PA |
| February 1934 | | at Ursinus | W 37–35 | 3–6 (2–4) | 10 – Shuipis | – | – | |
| February 10, 1934* | | Brooklyn Polytech | W 30–23 | 4–6 | 13 – Knapp | – | – | Curtis Hall Gym; Philadelphia, PA |
| February 15, 1934 | | Franklin & Marshall | L 35–36 | 4–7 (2–5) | – | – | – | Curtis Hall Gym; Philadelphia, PA |
| February 17, 1934 | | Muhlenberg | L 25–32 | 4–8 (2–6) | – | – | – | Curtis Hall Gym; Philadelphia, PA |
| February 23, 1934 | | at Gettysburg | L 24–52 | 4–9 (2–7) | – | – | – | |
| February 24, 1934 | | at Lebanon Valley | L 44–45 ^{OT} | 4–10 (2–8) | – | – | – | |
| February 28, 1934 | | Ursinus | L 30–32 | 4–11 (2–9) | – | – | – | Curtis Hall Gym; Philadelphia, PA |
| March 3, 1934 | | Albright | L 22–42 | 4–12 (2–10) | – | – | – | Curtis Hall Gym; Philadelphia, PA |
*Non-conference game. ^{#}Rankings from AP. (#) Tournament seedings in parentheses. All times are in Eastern Time.
