= 1940–41 Drexel Dragons men's basketball team =

American college basketball season

1940–41 Drexel Dragons men's basketball
- Conference: Independent
- Record: 5–9
- Head coach: Lawrence Mains (2nd season)
- Home arena: Curtis Hall Gym

The 1940–41 Drexel Dragons men's basketball team represented Drexel Institute of Technology during the 1940–41 men's basketball season. The Dragons, led by 2nd year head coach Lawrence Mains, played their home games at Curtis Hall Gym.

== Roster ==
1940–41 Drexel Dragons men's basketball team
Players	Coaches
Pos. / # / Name / Height / Weight / Year / Previous school / Hometown; / 6 / Jack Etsweiler (C) / — / —	Head coach: Lawrence Mains (Wisconsin); Assistant coach(es) Legend: (C) Team captain; (S) Suspended; (I) Ineligible; (W) Walk-on; Injured; Current redshirt

== Schedule ==
Date time, TV	Rank^{#}	Opponent^{#}	Result	Record	High points	High rebounds	High assists	Site (attendance) city, state
Regular season
January 11, 1941*		Philadelphia Textile	W 39–35	1–0	11 – Estweiler	–	–	Curtis Hall Gym; Philadelphia, PA
January 15, 1941*		at Lafayette	L 33–48	1–1	10 – Estweiler	–	–	
January 25, 1941*		Western Maryland	L 36–40	1–2	–	–	–	Curtis Hall Gym; Philadelphia, PA
February 1, 1941*		Johns Hopkins	W 41–30	1–3	–	–	–	Curtis Hall Gym; Philadelphia, PA
February 4, 1941*		at Ursinus	L 31–47	1–4	–	–	–	Collegeville, PA
February 7, 1941*		Juniata	W 40–32	2–4	–	–	–	Curtis Hall Gym; Philadelphia, PA
February 8, 1941*		at Dickinson	L 36–55	2–5	–	–	–	
February 12, 1941		at Haverford	W 37–29	3–5	–	–	–	Ryan Gym; Haverford, PA
February 15, 1941*		at Delaware	L 28–36	3–6	–	–	–	Newark, DE
February 20, 1941*		at Swarthmore	L 45–66	3–7	–	–	–	
February 22, 1941*		Susquehanna	L 35–48	3–8	–	–	–	Curtis Hall Gym; Philadelphia, PA
February 28, 1941*		at Brooklyn Polytech	L 37–39	3–9	–	–	–	
March 1, 1941*		at Rensselaer	W 43–39	4–9	–	–	–	Robison Gym; Troy, NY
March 5, 1941*		Ursinus	W 50–42	5–9	–	–	–	Curtis Hall Gym; Philadelphia, PA
*Non-conference game. ^{#}Rankings from AP. (#) Tournament seedings in parentheses. All times are in Eastern Time.

== Letterwinners ==
Curtiss Deardorff, James Frank, Jack Styers
