= 1934–35 Drexel Dragons men's basketball team =

American college basketball season

1934–35 Drexel Dragons men's basketball
- Conference: Eastern Pennsylvania Collegiate Basketball League
- Record: 7–10 (4–8 EPCBL)
- Head coach: Ernest Lange (3rd season)
- Captain: Henry Wallace
- Home arena: Curtis Hall Gym

1934–35 EPCBL men's basketball standings
	Conf.				Overall
Team	W		L	PCT	W		L	PCT
Gettysburg	11	–	1	.917	14	–	3	.824
Muhlenberg	9	–	3	.750		–		–
Franklin & Marshall	7	–	4	.636		–		–
Albright	4	–	8	.333		–		–
Drexel	4	–	8	.333	7	–	10	.412
Lebanon Valley	3	–	8	.273		–		–
Ursinus	3	–	9	.250		–		–

The 1934–35 Drexel Dragons men's basketball team represented Drexel Institute of Art, Science and Industry during the 1934–35 men's basketball season. The Dragons, led by 3rd year head coach Ernest Lange, played their home games at Curtis Hall Gym and were members of the Eastern Pennsylvania Collegiate Basketball League (EPCBL).

== Roster ==
1934–35 Drexel Dragons men's basketball team
Players
Coaches

Pos.	#	Name	Height	Weight	Year	Previous school	Hometown
G		Henry Wallace (C)	—	—	Sr
		Mered Hoff	—	—
		Walter Kline	—	—
		David Curry	—	—
		Matthew Donaldson	—	—
		Frank Jankuskas	—	—

Head coach

- Ernest Lange (Wisconsin)

Assistant coach(es)

Legend

- (C) Team captain
- (S) Suspended
- (I) Ineligible
- (W) Walk-on
- Injured
- Current redshirt

== Schedule ==
Date time, TV	Rank^{#}	Opponent^{#}	Result	Record	High points	High rebounds	High assists	Site (attendance) city, state
Regular season
January 9, 1935		at Muhlenberg	L 24–38	0–1 (0–1)	–	–	–	
January 12, 1935		Albright	W 31–30	1–1 (1–1)	10 – Donaldson	–	–	Curtis Hall Gym; Philadelphia, PA
January 16, 1935*		at Haverford	W 27–22	2–1	–	–	–	Ryan Gym; Haverford, PA
January 19, 1935		Gettysburg	L 27–34	2–2 (1–2)	–	–	–	Curtis Hall Gym; Philadelphia, PA
January 23, 1935		at Franklin & Marshall	L –	2–3 (1–3)	–	–	–	
January 25, 1935*		Philadelphia Textile	W –	3–3	–	–	–	Curtis Hall Gym; Philadelphia, PA
January 30, 1935		Lebanon Valley	W 52–35	4–3 (2–3)	18 – Hoff	–	–	Curtis Hall Gym; Philadelphia, PA
February 2, 1935		Muhlenberg	L 34–36	4–4 (2–4)	–	–	–	Curtis Hall Gym; Philadelphia, PA
February 5, 1935		Ursinus	W 30–29 ^{2OT}	5–4 (3–4)	– Tied	–	–	Curtis Hall Gym; Philadelphia, PA
February 9, 1935		Franklin & Marshall	L 21–39	5–5 (3–5)	–	–	–	Curtis Hall Gym; Philadelphia, PA
February 11, 1935*		at Brooklyn Polytech	L 32–37	5–6	–	–	–	
February 15, 1935		at Lebanon Valley	W 43–42	6–6 (4–5)	–	–	–	
February 16, 1935		at Gettysburg	L 14–57	6–7 (4–6)	–	–	–	
February 20, 1935*		Philadelphia Pharmacy	W 29–23	7–7	–	–	–	Curtis Hall Gym; Philadelphia, PA
February 27, 1935		at Ursinus	L 16–37	7–8 (4–7)	–	–	–	Thompson-Gay Gym; Collegeville, PA
March 2, 1935		at Albright	Postponed to March 13 (Measles)					Reading, PA
March 5, 1935*		at Penn Athletic Club	L 21–31	7–9	–	–	–	
March 13, 1935; 8:30 pm		at Albright; Rescheduled from March 2	L 37–50	7–10 (4–8)	–	–	–	Reading YMCA; Reading, PA
*Non-conference game. ^{#}Rankings from AP. (#) Tournament seedings in parentheses. All times are in Eastern Time.
