= 1945–46 Drexel Dragons men's basketball team =

American college basketball season

1945–46 Drexel Dragons men's basketball
- Conference: Middle Atlantic States Collegiate Athletic Conference
- Southern
- Record: 2–14 (2–8 MASCAC)
- Head coach: John McNally (1st season)
- Home arena: Curtis Hall Gym

The 1945–46 Drexel Dragons men's basketball team represented Drexel Institute of Technology during the 1945–46 men's basketball season. The Dragons, led by 1st year head coach John McNally, played their home games at Curtis Hall Gym and were members of the Southern division of the Middle Atlantic States Collegiate Athletic Conference (MASCAC).

== Roster ==
1945–46 Drexel Dragons men's basketball team
Players
Coaches

Pos.	#	Name	Height	Weight	Year	Previous school	Hometown
		Joseph De Stephano	—	—
		Stanley Endresick	—	—
		George Brown Hill	—	—
		Harry Katzoff	—	—
		Robert Lowry	—	—
		Leonard Sabel	—	—
		Dave Drummond	—	—
		Robert Mason	—	—

Head coach

- John McNally

Assistant coach(es)

Legend

- (C) Team captain
- (S) Suspended
- (I) Ineligible
- (W) Walk-on
- Injured
- Current redshirt

== Schedule ==
Date time, TV	Rank^{#}	Opponent^{#}	Result	Record	High points	High rebounds	High assists	Site (attendance) city, state
Regular season
January 16, 1946*		at Dickinson	L 30–41	0–1	9 – Sobel	–	–	(500)
January 19, 1946*; 7:30 pm		Dickinson	L 31–49	0–2	10 – Drummond	–	–	Curtis Hall Gym; Philadelphia, PA
January 1946		at Ursinus	L 42–57	0–3 (0–1)	12 – Sobel	–	–	Collegeville, PA
January 25, 1946		at Swarthmore	L 24–58	0–4 (0–2)	–	–	–	
January 26, 1946*		Lebanon Valley	L 39–55	0–5	14 – De Stephano	–	–	Curtis Hall Gym; Philadelphia, PA
February 2, 1946; 8:00 pm		Swarthmore	L 37–45	0–6 (0–3)	15 – Mason	–	–	Curtis Hall Gym; Philadelphia, PA
February 4, 1946		Delaware	L 35–43	0–7 (0–4)	14 – Mason	–	–	Curtis Hall Gym; Philadelphia, PA
February 6, 1946		at Pennsylvania Military College	L –	0–8 (0–5)	–	–	–	
February 9, 1946*		at Rutgers	L –	0–9	–	–	–	
February 20, 1946		Ursinus	L 36–39	0–10 (0–6)	10 – Mason	–	–	Curtis Hall Gym; Philadelphia, PA
February 23, 1946*		at Lebanon Valley	L 27–60	0–11	–	–	–	Lebanon High School (PA); Lebanon, PA
February 26, 1946		at Delaware	L 41–48	0–12 (0–7)	14 – Ellman	–	–	Newark, DE
February 27, 1946		at Haverford	W 44–43	1–12 (1–7)	21 – De Stefano	–	–	Ryan Gym; Haverford, PA
March 2, 1946*		at CCNY	L 30–61	1–13	10 – Sobel	–	–	New York, NY
March 6, 1946		Pennsylvania Military College	W 47–45	2–13 (2–7)	–	–	–	Curtis Hall Gym; Philadelphia, PA
March 9, 1946		Haverford	L 32–34	2–14 (2–8)	–	–	–	Curtis Hall Gym; Philadelphia, PA
*Non-conference game. ^{#}Rankings from AP. (#) Tournament seedings in parentheses. All times are in Eastern Time.
