= 1947–48 Drexel Dragons men's basketball team =

American college basketball season

1947–48 Drexel Dragons men's basketball
- Conference: Middle Atlantic States Collegiate Athletic Conference
- Southern
- Record: 5–14 (2–8 MASCAC)
- Head coach: Ralph Chase (2nd season)
- Home arena: Curtis Hall Gym

The 1947–48 Drexel Dragons men's basketball team represented Drexel Institute of Technology during the 1947–48 men's basketball season. The Dragons, led by 2nd year head coach Ralph Chase, played their home games at Curtis Hall Gym and were members of the Southern division of the Middle Atlantic States Collegiate Athletic Conference (MASCAC).

== Roster ==
1947–48 Drexel Dragons men's basketball team
Players
Coaches

Pos.	#	Name	Height	Weight	Year	Previous school	Hometown
G	4	Jules Schwab	—	—	So	Allentown HS
			—	—

Head coach

- Ralph Chase (Pittsburgh)

Assistant coach(es)

Legend

- (C) Team captain
- (S) Suspended
- (I) Ineligible
- (W) Walk-on
- Injured
- Current redshirt

== Schedule ==
Date time, TV	Rank^{#}	Opponent^{#}	Result	Record	High points	High rebounds	High assists	Site (attendance) city, state
Regular season
January 7, 1948		Delaware	W 57–55	1–0 (1–0)	12 – DiStephano	–	–	Curtis Hall Gym; Philadelphia, PA
January 1948*		Lincoln	L 46–49 ^{OT}	1–1	19 – Schwab	–	–	
January 14, 1948		Haverford	W 66–54	2–1 (2–0)	21 – Schwab	–	–	Curtis Hall Gym; Philadelphia, PA
January 17, 1948		at Swarthmore	L 42–67	2–2 (2–1)	16 – Savchak	–	–	
Unknown		Drexel Alumni	W 63–46	3–2	–	–	–	Curtis Hall Gym; Philadelphia, PA
January 24, 1948		at Pennsylvania Military College	L 44–66	3–3 (2–2)	13 – Morrisson	–	–	Chester, PA
January 28, 1948*		Stevens Tech	L 40–46	3–4	11 – Schwab	–	–	
January 31, 1948*		at Johns Hopkins	L 45–50	3–5	12 – Schwab	–	–	
February 4, 1948		Ursinus	L 44–59	3–6 (2–3)	–	–	–	
February 7, 1948*		Brooklyn Polytech	L 55–60	3–7	15 – Schwab	–	–	Curtis Hall Gym; Philadelphia, PA
February 9, 1948*		Philadelphia Textile	W 81–54	4–7	18 – Schwab	–	–	Curtis Hall Gym; Philadelphia, PA
February 11, 1948		at Delaware	L 45–65	4–8 (2–4)	–	–	–	Newark, DE
February 14, 1948*		Franklin & Marshall	L 66–67	4–9	19 – Schwab	–	–	Curtis Hall Gym; Philadelphia, PA
February 17, 1948*		vs. Lehigh	W 54–53	5–9	19 – Schwab	–	–	Convention Hall; Philadelphia, PA
February 21, 1948		at Haverford	L 52–63	5–10 (2–5)	15 – Breder	–	–	Ryan Gym; Haverford, PA
February 25, 1948		Swarthmore	L 42–48	5–11 (2–6)	–	–	–	Curtis Hall Gym; Philadelphia, PA
February 28, 1948*		at Moravian	L 37–86	5–12	–	–	–	Liberty HS (PA); Bethlehem, PA
March 3, 1948		Pennsylvania Military College	L 63–86	5–13 (2–7)	16 – Schwab	–	–	Curtis Hall Gym; Philadelphia, PA
March 6, 1948		Ursinus	L 47–62	5–14 (2–8)	–	–	–	
*Non-conference game. ^{#}Rankings from AP. (#) Tournament seedings in parentheses. All times are in Eastern Time.
