= 1917–18 Drexel Blue and Gold men's basketball team =

American college basketball season

1917–18 Drexel Blue and Gold men's basketball
- Conference: Independent
- Record: –
- Head coach: No coach
- Captain: A. S. Mahan
- Home arena: Main Building

The 1917–18 Drexel Blue and Gold men's basketball team represented Drexel Institute of Art, Science and Industry during the 1916–17 men's basketball season. The Blue and Gold played their home games at Main Building.

== Roster ==
1917–18 Drexel Dragons men's basketball team
Players
Coaches

Pos.	#	Name	Height	Weight	Year	Previous school	Hometown
		A. S. Mahan (C)	—	—
			—	—

Head coach

Assistant coach(es)

Legend

- (C) Team captain
- (S) Suspended
- (I) Ineligible
- (W) Walk-on
- Injured
- Current redshirt

== Schedule ==
Date time, TV	Rank^{#}	Opponent^{#}	Result	Record	High points	High rebounds	High assists	Site (attendance) city, state
Regular season
December 8, 1917*		at Stevens Tech	L 8–52		–	–	–	
December 14, 1917*		Philadelphia School of Pedagogy						
December 21, 1917*		Stevens Tech	L 29–49		–	–	–	Main Building; Philadelphia, PA
January 10, 1918*		Lebanon Valley	L 24–42		–	–	–	Main Building; Philadelphia, PA
January 12, 1918*		at Delaware	L 20–35		–	–	–	Taylor Gym; Newark, DE
March 2, 1918*		at Lebanon Valley						Huntingdon, PA
*Non-conference game. ^{#}Rankings from AP. (#) Tournament seedings in parentheses. All times are in Eastern Time.
