= 1923–24 Drexel Blue and Gold men's basketball team =

American college basketball season

1923–24 Drexel Blue and Gold men's basketball
- Conference: Independent
- Record: –
- Head coach: Harvey O'Brien (2nd season)
- Home arena: Main Building

The 1923–24 Drexel Blue and Gold men's basketball team represented Drexel Institute of Art, Science and Industry during the 1923–24 men's basketball season. The Blue and Gold, led by 2nd year head coach Harvey O'Brien, played their home games at Main Building.

== Roster ==
1923–24 Drexel Dragons men's basketball team
Players
Coaches

Pos.	#	Name	Height	Weight	Year	Previous school	Hometown
		Michael Dugan	—	—	So
		Joseph Foley	—	—	Fr
		Charles O'Neil	—	—
		Samuel James	—	—

Head coach

- Harvey O'Brien (Swarthmore)

Assistant coach(es)

Legend

- (C) Team captain
- (S) Suspended
- (I) Ineligible
- (W) Walk-on
- Injured
- Current redshirt

== Schedule ==
Date time, TV	Rank^{#}	Opponent^{#}	Result	Record	High points	High rebounds	High assists	Site (attendance) city, state
Regular season
December 8, 1923*		at Penn; Battle of 33rd Street	L 13–28		–	–	–	Weightman Hall; Philadelphia, PA
January 18, 1924*		at Pratt	L 16–41		6 – tied	–	–	
January 19, 2024*		at Stevens Tech	W 16–14 ^{OT}		4 – tied	–	–	Hoboken, NJ
February 9, 1924*		Haverford	W 29–19		–	–	–	Main Building; Philadelphia, PA
February 27, 1924*		Haverford	W 27–15		–	–	–	Main Building; Philadelphia, PA
February 28, 1924*		at Delaware	W 22–20		–	–	–	Taylor Gym; Newark, DE
Unknown*		Villanova						
*Non-conference game. ^{#}Rankings from AP. (#) Tournament seedings in parentheses. All times are in Eastern Time.
