= 1922–23 Drexel Blue and Gold men's basketball team =

American college basketball season

1922–23 Drexel Blue and Gold men's basketball
- Conference: Independent
- Record: –
- Head coach: Harvey O'Brien (1st season)
- Home arena: Main Building

The 1922–23 Drexel Blue and Gold men's basketball team represented Drexel Institute of Art, Science and Industry during the 1922–23 men's basketball season. The Blue and Gold, led by 1st year head coach Harvey O'Brien, played their home games at Main Building.

== Roster ==
1922–23 Drexel Dragons men's basketball team
Players
Coaches

Pos.	#	Name	Height	Weight	Year	Previous school	Hometown
		Michael Dugan	—	—	Fr
		S. Jones	—	—
		Shipps	—	—
		James Siddall	—	—

Head coach

- Harvey O'Brien (Swarthmore)

Assistant coach(es)

Legend

- (C) Team captain
- (S) Suspended
- (I) Ineligible
- (W) Walk-on
- Injured
- Current redshirt

== Schedule ==
Date time, TV	Rank^{#}	Opponent^{#}	Result	Record	High points	High rebounds	High assists	Site (attendance) city, state
Regular season
December 6, 1922*		Philadelphia Osteopathic						Main Building; Philadelphia, PA
December 13, 1922*		at Penn; Battle of 33rd Street	L 16–48		–	–	–	Weightman Hall; Philadelphia, PA
January 12, 1923*		Philadelphia Textile						Main Building; Philadelphia, PA
January 16, 1923*		Philadelphia Pharmacy						Main Building; Philadelphia, PA
January 20, 1923*		at Pennsylvania Military College						Chester, PA
January 27, 1923*		at Haverford	W 27–18		–	–	–	Ryan Gym; Haverford, PA
January 31, 1923*		Penn Junior Varsity						Main Building; Philadelphia, PA
February 2, 1923*		Brooklyn Polytech	W 27–25		14 – Weinberger	–	–	Main Building; Philadelphia, PA
February 9, 1923*		Brooklyn Law	W 54–24		20 – Weinberger	–	–	Main Building; Philadelphia, PA
February 16, 1923*		at Pratt	L 28–32		–	–	–	
February 21, 1923*		Lebanon Valley						Main Building; Philadelphia, PA
February 24, 1923*		Princeton Nassau	W –		–	–	–	Main Building; Philadelphia, PA
March 3, 1923*		Drexel Alumni						Main Building; Philadelphia, PA
*Non-conference game. ^{#}Rankings from AP. (#) Tournament seedings in parentheses. All times are in Eastern Time.
