= 1914–15 Drexel Blue and Gold men's basketball team =

American college basketball season

1914–15 Drexel Blue and Gold men's basketball
- Conference: Independent
- Record: –
- Head coach: E.L. Lucas (1st season)
- Home arena: Main Building

The 1914–15 Drexel Blue and Gold men's basketball team represented Drexel Institute of Art, Science and Industry during the 1914–15 men's basketball season. The Blue and Gold, led by 1st year head coach E.L. Lucas, played their home games at Main Building.

== Roster ==
1914–15 Drexel Dragons men's basketball team
Players
Coaches

Pos.	#	Name	Height	Weight	Year	Previous school	Hometown
G		Raymond Walls (C)	—	—	Sr
		Demaris	—	—

Head coach

- E.L. Lucas

Assistant coach(es)

Legend

- (C) Team captain
- (S) Suspended
- (I) Ineligible
- (W) Walk-on
- Injured
- Current redshirt

== Schedule ==
Date time, TV	Rank^{#}	Opponent^{#}	Result	Record	High points	High rebounds	High assists	Site (attendance) city, state
Regular season
December 9, 1914*		at St. John's (NY)	L 16–28	–	12 – Demars	–	–	Brooklyn, NY
February 3, 1915*		at Saint Joseph's	Cancelled					Philadelphia, PA
February 17, 1915*		Delaware	W 35–21		–	–	–	Philadelphia, PA
February 23, 1915*		at Delaware	L 18–32		13 – Demaris	–	–	Taylor Gym; Newark, DE
Unknown*		Philadelphia School of Pedagogy	W –		–	–	–	
Unknown*		Brooklyn Polytech						
Unknown*		Ursinus						
Unknown*		Washington (MD)						
*Non-conference game. ^{#}Rankings from AP. (#) Tournament seedings in parentheses. All times are in Eastern Time.
