= 1939–40 Drexel Dragons men's basketball team =

American college basketball season

1939–40 Drexel Dragons men's basketball
- Conference: Independent
- Record: 3–13
- Head coach: Lawrence Mains (1st season)
- Home arena: Curtis Hall Gym

The 1939–40 Drexel Dragons men's basketball team represented Drexel Institute of Technology during the 1939–40 men's basketball season. The Dragons, led by 1st year head coach Lawrence Mains, played their home games at Curtis Hall Gym.

== Roster ==
1939–40 Drexel Dragons men's basketball team
Players
Coaches

Pos.	#	Name	Height	Weight	Year	Previous school	Hometown
		Jack Etsweiler	—	—
		Kenneth Rodgers	—	—
		Leonard Barris	—	—
		Joseph Barron	—	—
		Townsend Clark	—	—
		Jack Gilliford	—	—
		Louis Greene	—	—
		Elmer Patterson	—	—
		William Piltz	—	—
		George Thompson	—	—

Head coach

- Lawrence Mains (Wisconsin)

Assistant coach(es)

Legend

- (C) Team captain
- (S) Suspended
- (I) Ineligible
- (W) Walk-on
- Injured
- Current redshirt

== Schedule ==
Date time, TV	Rank^{#}	Opponent^{#}	Result	Record	High points	High rebounds	High assists	Site (attendance) city, state
Exhibition
January 2, 1940*		vs. West Chester; Yeadon Junior HS Gym Dedication	L 32–48	0–1	9 – Barris	–	–	Yeadon Junior HS Gym; Yeadon, PA
Regular season
January 6, 1940*		Philadelphia Pharmacy	L 30–34	1–0	–	–	–	Curtis Hall Gym; Philadelphia, PA
January 10, 1940*		Philadelphia Textile	L 30–33	1–1	7 – Tied	–	–	Curtis Hall Gym; Philadelphia, PA
January 16, 1940*		at Haverford	L 19–29	1–2	5 – Tied	–	–	
January 19, 1940*		at Johns Hopkins	L 36–48	1–3	14 – O'Hara	–	–	
January 20, 1940*		at Western Maryland; First Game Played at Gill Gymnasium	L 29–50	1–4	5 – 4 Tied	–	–	Gill Gymnasium; Westminster, MD
January 27, 1940*		Susquehanna	W 21–16	2–4	5 – Tied	–	–	Curtis Hall Gym; Philadelphia, PA
February 2, 1940*		Rensselaer	L 33–45	2–5	9 – Estweiler	–	–	Curtis Hall Gym; Philadelphia, PA
February 3, 1940*		at Delaware	L 35–38	2–6	18 – Barris	–	–	Newark, DE
February 10, 1940*		Dickinson	L 31–36	2–7	12 – Barris	–	–	Curtis Hall Gym; Philadelphia, PA
February 14, 1940*		Delaware	L 44–57	2–8	–	–	–	Curtis Hall Gym; Philadelphia, PA
February 17, 1940*		Lafayette	L 25–43	2–9	–	–	–	Curtis Hall Gym; Philadelphia, PA
February 19, 1940*		Ursinus	L 29–39	2–10	–	–	–	Curtis Hall Gym; Philadelphia, PA
February 23, 1940*		Brooklyn Polytech	L 28–31	2–11	–	–	–	Curtis Hall Gym; Philadelphia, PA
February 28, 1940*		Swarthmore	L 39–52	2–12	–	–	–	Curtis Hall Gym; Philadelphia, PA
March 1, 1940*		American	W 41–36	3–12	–	–	–	Curtis Hall Gym; Philadelphia, PA
March 5, 1940*		at Ursinus	L 36–39	3–13	–	–	–	
*Non-conference game. ^{#}Rankings from AP. (#) Tournament seedings in parentheses. All times are in Eastern Time.
