= 1924–25 Drexel Blue and Gold men's basketball team =

American college basketball season

1924–25 Drexel Blue and Gold men's basketball
- Conference: Independent
- Record: –
- Head coach: Harvey O'Brien (3rd season)
- Home arena: Main Building

The 1924–25 Drexel Blue and Gold men's basketball team represented Drexel Institute of Art, Science and Industry during the 1924–25 men's basketball season. The Blue and Gold, led by 3rd year head coach Harvey O'Brien, played their home games at Main Building.

== Roster ==
1924–25 Drexel Dragons men's basketball team
Players
Coaches

Pos.	#	Name	Height	Weight	Year	Previous school	Hometown
C		Michael Dugan (C)	—	—	Jr
G		Joseph Foley	—	—	So
G		Carl Gregory	—	—	Fr	Latrobe HS
		James Logan	—	—	Fr
F		Christian Schwartz	—	—	Fr
		Edward Powers	—	—
		Charles O'Neil	—	—
		Charles Gibbs	—	—
		Joseph Greenburg	—	—

Head coach

- Harvey O'Brien (Swarthmore)

Assistant coach(es)

Legend

- (C) Team captain
- (S) Suspended
- (I) Ineligible
- (W) Walk-on
- Injured
- Current redshirt

== Schedule ==
Date time, TV	Rank^{#}	Opponent^{#}	Result	Record	High points	High rebounds	High assists	Site (attendance) city, state
Regular season
December 6, 1924*		at Penn; Battle of 33rd Street	L 11–34		3 – tied	–	–	Weightman Hall; Philadelphia, PA
January 7, 1925*		Philadelphia Osteopathic	L 29–30		–	–	–	
January 13, 1925*		at Franklin & Marshall	L 26–34		–	–	–	
February 7, 1925*		at Seton Hall	L 26–42		7 – Swartz	–	–	
February 13, 1925*		Franklin & Marshall	L 22–30		–	–	–	Main Building; Philadelphia, PA
February 21, 1925*		at Delaware	L 28–38		–	–	–	Taylor Gym; Newark, DE
February 25, 1925*		at Haverford	L 21–53		–	–	–	Ryan Gym; Haverford, PA
March 4, 1925*		Seton Hall	L 25–39		–	–	–	Main Building; Philadelphia, PA
Unknown*		Carnegie Tech	L –		–	–	–	
Unknown*		George Washington	L 18–31		–	–	–	
*Non-conference game. ^{#}Rankings from AP. (#) Tournament seedings in parentheses. All times are in Eastern Time.
