= 1946–47 Drexel Dragons men's basketball team =

American college basketball season

1946–47 Drexel Dragons men's basketball
- Conference: Middle Atlantic States Collegiate Athletic Conference
- Southern
- Record: 10–8 (7–3 MASCAC)
- Head coach: Ralph Chase (1st season)
- Home arena: Curtis Hall Gym

The 1946–47 Drexel Dragons men's basketball team represented Drexel Institute of Technology during the 1946–47 men's basketball season. The Dragons, led by 1st year head coach Ralph Chase, played their home games at Curtis Hall Gym and were members of the Southern division of the Middle Atlantic States Collegiate Athletic Conference (MASCAC).

== Roster ==
1946–47 Drexel Dragons men's basketball team
Players	Coaches
Pos. / # / Name / Height / Weight / Year / Previous school / Hometown; / / / — / —	Head coach: Ralph Chase (Pittsburgh); Assistant coach(es) Legend: (C) Team captain; (S) Suspended; (I) Ineligible; (W) Walk-on; Injured; Current redshirt

== Schedule ==
Date time, TV	Rank^{#}	Opponent^{#}	Result	Record	High points	High rebounds	High assists	Site (attendance) city, state
Regular season
January 1947*		Philadelphia Naval Hospital	W 74–46	1–0	–	–	–	
January 1947		Ursinus	L 50–60	1–1 (0–1)	–	–	–	
January 11, 1947; 8:30 pm		at Delaware	L 37–38	1–2 (0–2)	–	–	–	Carpenter Field House; Newark, DE
January 15, 1947		Swarthmore	W 57–55	2–2 (1–2)	–	–	–	Curtis Hall Gym; Philadelphia, PA
January 17, 1947*		at Stevens Tech	L 44–52	2–3	–	–	–	Hoboken, NJ
January 18, 1947*		at Brooklyn Polytech	L 50–54	2–4	–	–	–	
January 22, 1947*		Lehigh	L 56–70	2–5	–	–	–	
January 1947		Pennsylvania Military College	W 55–45	3–5 (2–2)	–	–	–	
February 1, 1947*		Johns Hopkins	W 51–45	4–5	–	–	–	
February 5, 1947*		at Franklin & Marshall	L 58–64	4–6	–	–	–	
February 8, 1947		Haverford	W 70–51	5–6 (3–2)	–	–	–	Curtis Hall Gym; Philadelphia, PA
February 1947		Pennsylvania Military College	W 90–61	6–6 (4–2)	–	–	–	
February 15, 1947		Delaware	W 85–56	7–6 (5–2)	–	–	–	Curtis Hall Gym; Philadelphia, PA
February 19, 1947		Ursinus	W 70–61	8–6 (6–2)	13 – Kollar	–	–	Curtis Hall Gym; Philadelphia, PA
February 22, 1947		at Haverford	W 68–48	9–6 (7–2)	15 – Kollar	–	–	Ryan Gym; Haverford, PA
February 26, 1947		at Swarthmore	L 45–54	9–7 (7–3)	–	–	–	
March 5, 1947*		at Philadelphia Naval Hospital	W –	10–7	–	–	–	Naval Hospital Philadelphia; Philadelphia, PA
March 8, 1947*		Dickinson	L 73–81	10–8	29 – Kollar	–	–	
*Non-conference game. ^{#}Rankings from AP. (#) Tournament seedings in parentheses. All times are in Eastern Time.
