= 1936–37 Drexel Dragons men's basketball team =

American college basketball season

1936–37 Drexel Dragons men's basketball
- Conference: Eastern Pennsylvania Collegiate Basketball League
- Record: 8–8 (5–7 EPCBL)
- Head coach: Ernest Lange (5th season)
- Captain: Matthew Donaldson
- Home arena: Curtis Hall Gym

1936–37 EPCBL men's basketball standings
	Conf.				Overall
Team	W		L	PCT	W		L	PCT
Franklin & Marshall	11	–	1	.917	13	–	3	.813
Gettysburg	10	–	2	.833	15	–	2	.882
Lebanon Valley	6	–	6	.500		–		–
Muhlenberg	6	–	6	.500		–		–
Drexel	5	–	7	.417	8	–	8	.500
Albright	3	–	9	.250		–		–
Ursinus	1	–	11	.083		–		–

The 1936–37 Drexel Dragons men's basketball team represented Drexel Institute of Technology during the 1936–37 men's basketball season. The Dragons, led by 5th year head coach Ernest Lange, played their home games at Curtis Hall Gym and were members of the Eastern Pennsylvania Collegiate Basketball League (EPCBL).

== Roster ==
1936–37 Drexel Dragons men's basketball team
Players
Coaches

Pos.	#	Name	Height	Weight	Year	Previous school	Hometown
F		David Curry	—	—
F	9	Matthew Donaldson (C)	—	—
		William Kulesh	—	—
		Joseph Rhile	—	—
C		Theodore "Ted" Layton	—	—
G		William Lignelli	—	—
		George Nanos	—	—

Head coach

- Ernest Lange (Wisconsin)

Assistant coach(es)

Legend

- (C) Team captain
- (S) Suspended
- (I) Ineligible
- (W) Walk-on
- Injured
- Current redshirt

== Schedule ==
Date time, TV	Rank^{#}	Opponent^{#}	Result	Record	High points	High rebounds	High assists	Site (attendance) city, state
Regular season
January 6, 1937		Muhlenberg	W 32–24	1–0 (1–0)	11 – Layton	–	–	Curtis Hall Gym; Philadelphia, PA
January 9, 1937		at Albright	W 30–25	2–0 (2–0)	–	–	–	
January 13, 1937		at Franklin & Marshall	L 33–35	2–1 (2–1)	12 – Curry	–	–	Lancaster, PA
January 16, 1937		Gettysburg	L 25–31	2–2 (2–2)	9 – Donaldson	–	–	Curtis Hall Gym; Philadelphia, PA
January 19, 1937		Lebanon Valley	Postponed to February 1					Curtis Hall Gym; Philadelphia, PA
January 30, 1937		at Muhlenberg	L 19–22	2–3 (2–3)	6 – Curry	–	–	
February 1, 1937		Lebanon Valley; Rescheduled from January 19	W 39–33	3–3 (3–3)	16 – Donaldson	–	–	Curtis Hall Gym; Philadelphia, PA
February 6, 1937		Franklin & Marshall	L 33–47	3–4 (3–4)	16 – Donaldson	–	–	Curtis Hall Gym; Philadelphia, PA
February 12, 1937		at Gettysburg	L 24–61	3–5 (3–5)	9 – Donaldson	–	–	
February 13, 1937		at Lebanon Valley	L 30–40	3–6 (3–6)	10 – Tied	–	–	
February 17, 1937*		Delaware	W 50–47	4–6	–	–	–	Curtis Hall Gym; Philadelphia, PA
February 19, 1937*		Susquehanna	W 32–24	5–6	–	–	–	Curtis Hall Gym; Philadelphia, PA
February 23, 1937		Ursinus	L 38–40	5–7 (3–7)	18 – Donaldson	–	–	Curtis Hall Gym; Philadelphia, PA
February 27, 1937		Albright	W 46–36	6–7 (4–7)	16 – Kulesh	–	–	Curtis Hall Gym; Philadelphia, PA
March 3, 1937		at Ursinus	W 46–25	7–7 (5–7)	–	–	–	
March 5, 1937*		at Brooklyn Polytech	L 34–35	7–8	–	–	–	Odd Fellows Hall; New York, NY
March 6, 1937*		at Pratt	W 45–13	8–8	–	–	–	
*Non-conference game. ^{#}Rankings from AP. (#) Tournament seedings in parentheses. All times are in Eastern Time.

== Awards ==
Matthew Donaldson

- EPCBL All-Conference Second Team

David Curry

- EPCBL All-Conference Honorable Mention

Theodore Layton

- EPCBL All-Conference Honorable Mention

William Lignelli

- EPCBL All-Conference Honorable Mention
