= 1909–10 Drexel Blue and Gold men's basketball team =

American college basketball season

1909–10 Drexel Blue and Gold men's basketball
- Conference: Independent
- Record: –
- Head coach: No coach
- Home arena: Main Building

The 1909–10 Drexel Blue and Gold men's basketball team represented Drexel Institute of Art, Science and Industry during the 1909–10 men's basketball season. The Blue and Gold, who played without a head coach, played their home games at Main Building.

== Roster ==
1909–10 Drexel Dragons men's basketball team
Players
Coaches

Pos.	#	Name	Height	Weight	Year	Previous school	Hometown
		Ferron	—	—
			—	—

Head coach

- No coach

Assistant coach(es)

Legend

- (C) Team captain
- (S) Suspended
- (I) Ineligible
- (W) Walk-on
- Injured
- Current redshirt

== Schedule ==
Date time, TV	Rank^{#}	Opponent^{#}	Result	Record	High points	High rebounds	High assists	Site (attendance) city, state
Regular season
Unknown*		Bordentown Military Institute						
Unknown*		Pennsylvania School for the Deaf and Dumb	W –		–	–	–	
Unknown*		Trenton State						
Unknown*		West Jersey Academy						
*Non-conference game. ^{#}Rankings from AP. (#) Tournament seedings in parentheses. All times are in Eastern Time.
