= 1903–04 Drexel Blue and Gold men's basketball team =

American college basketball season

1903–04 Drexel Blue and Gold men's basketball
- Conference: Independent
- Record: –
- Head coach: No coach
- Captain: Duffield
- Home arena: Main Building

The 1903–04 Drexel Blue and Gold men's basketball team represented Drexel Institute of Art, Science and Industry during the 1903–04 men's basketball season. The Blue and Gold, who played without a head coach, played their home games at Main Building.

== Roster ==
1903–04 Drexel Dragons men's basketball team
Players
Coaches

Pos.	#	Name	Height	Weight	Year	Previous school	Hometown
F		Brokaw	—	—
F		Swallow	—	—
C		Marshall	—	—
C		Rubencane	—	—
G		Beatty	—	—
G		Duffield (C)	—	—
G		Shimpf	—	—

Head coach

- No coach

Assistant coach(es)

Legend

- (C) Team captain
- (S) Suspended
- (I) Ineligible
- (W) Walk-on
- Injured
- Current redshirt

== Schedule ==
Date time, TV	Rank^{#}	Opponent^{#}	Result	Record	High points	High rebounds	High assists	Site (attendance) city, state
Regular season
December, 1903*		at Company I	L 20–32	?–1	10 – Swallow	–	–	
February 1, 1904*		Eastburn Academy	W –54		–	–	–	St. James Hall
March 2, 1904*		at Princeton	L 15–56		–	–	–	Princeton, NJ
March 4, 1904*		Northeast Manual Training School						
March 9, 1904*		Central Manual Trade School						
Unknown*		Temple	L 13–19		–	–	–	
*Non-conference game. ^{#}Rankings from AP. (#) Tournament seedings in parentheses. All times are in Eastern Time.
