= 1935–36 Drexel Dragons men's basketball team =

American college basketball season

1935–36 Drexel Dragons men's basketball
- Conference: Eastern Pennsylvania Collegiate Basketball League
- Record: 8–9 (6–6 EPCBL)
- Head coach: Ernest Lange (4th season)
- Home arena: Curtis Hall Gym

1935–36 EPCBL men's basketball standings
	Conf.				Overall
Team	W		L	PCT	W		L	PCT
Franklin & Marshall	11	–	1	.917	13	–	2	.867
Gettysburg	9	–	3	.750	11	–	6	.647
Albright	7	–	5	.583		–		–
Drexel	6	–	6	.500	8	–	9	.471
Ursinus	5	–	7	.417		–		–
Lebanon Valley	2	–	10	.167		–		–
Muhlenberg	2	–	10	.167		–		–

The 1935–36 Drexel Dragons men's basketball team represented Drexel Institute of Art, Science and Industry during the 1935–36 men's basketball season. The Dragons, led by 4th year head coach Ernest Lange, played their home games at Curtis Hall Gym and were members of the Eastern Pennsylvania Collegiate Basketball League (EPCBL).

== Roster ==
1935–36 Drexel Dragons men's basketball team
Players
Coaches

Pos.	#	Name	Height	Weight	Year	Previous school	Hometown
		David Curry	—	—
		Matthew Donaldson	—	—
		Elwood Conard	—	—
		James Kirkland	—	—
		Joseph Lambert	—	—
		Theodore Layton	—	—
		William Lignelli	—	—
		George Nanos	—	—

Head coach

- Ernest Lange (Wisconsin)

Assistant coach(es)

Legend

- (C) Team captain
- (S) Suspended
- (I) Ineligible
- (W) Walk-on
- Injured
- Current redshirt

== Schedule ==
Date time, TV	Rank^{#}	Opponent^{#}	Result	Record	High points	High rebounds	High assists	Site (attendance) city, state
Regular season
December 7, 1935*		at Princeton	L 25–39	0–1	11 – Raynes	–	–	Princeton, NJ
January 8, 1936		Muhlenberg	W 52–40	1–1 (1–0)	10 – Raynes	–	–	Cutis Hall Gym; Philadelphia, PA
Unknown		at Albright	W 38–34	2–1 (2–0)	10 – Curry	–	–	Reading, PA
Unknown*		Swarthmore	W 39–35	3–1	11 – Raynes	–	–	Curtis Hall Gym; Philadelphia, PA
Unknown*		Susquehanna	L 31–46	3–2	10 – Edwards	–	–	Curtis Hall Gym; Philadelphia, PA
January 22, 1936		at Franklin & Marshall	L 34–44	3–3 (2–1)	10 – Layton	–	–	Lancaster, PA
January 24, 1936*		Brooklyn Polytech	W 43–29	4–3	9 – 3 Tied	–	–	Curtis Hall Gym; Philadelphia, PA
January 30, 1936		Gettysburg	L 25–33	4–4 (2–2)	–	–	–	Curtis Hall Gym; Philadelphia, PA
February 1, 1936		at Muhlenberg	W 35–33	5–4 (3–2)	9 – Lignelli	–	–	
February 4, 1936		Ursinus	W 32–30	6–4 (4–2)	10 – Raynes	–	–	Curtis Hall Gym; Philadelphia, PA
February 7, 1936		Franklin & Marshall	L 24–27	6–5 (4–3)	7 – Donaldson	–	–	
February 14, 1936		at Gettysburg	L 30–48	6–6 (4–4)	9 – Curry	–	–	
February 15, 1936		at Lebanon Valley	W 44–35	7–6 (5–4)	12 – Raynes	–	–	
February 19, 1936*		at Delaware	L 41–43	7–7	19 – Donaldson	–	–	Newark, DE
February 21, 1936		Lebanon Valley	W 30–25	8–7 (6–4)	7 – Donaldson	–	–	Curtis Hall Gym; Philadelphia, PA
Unknown		Albright	L 30–34	8–8 (6–5)	–	–	–	Curtis Hall Gym; Philadelphia, PA
Unknown		Ursinus	L –	8–9 (6–6)	–	–	–	Curtis Hall Gym; Philadelphia, PA
*Non-conference game. ^{#}Rankings from AP. (#) Tournament seedings in parentheses. All times are in Eastern Time.
