= 1915–16 Drexel Blue and Gold men's basketball team =

American college basketball season

1915–16 Drexel Blue and Gold men's basketball
- Conference: Independent
- Record: –
- Head coach: E.L. Lucas (2nd season)
- Captain: Raymond Walls
- Home arena: Main Building

The 1915–16 Drexel Blue and Gold men's basketball team represented Drexel Institute of Art, Science and Industry during the 1915–16 men's basketball season. The Blue and Gold, led by 2nd year head coach E.L. Lucas, played their home games at Main Building.

== Roster ==
1915–16 Drexel Dragons men's basketball team
Players
Coaches

Pos.	#	Name	Height	Weight	Year	Previous school	Hometown
G		Raymond Walls (C)	—	—	Sr
G		Pierson	—	—
F		Demaris	—	—
F		Herbert Eves	—	—	Fr
C		Smith	—	—

Head coach

- E.L. Lucas

Assistant coach(es)

Legend

- (C) Team captain
- (S) Suspended
- (I) Ineligible
- (W) Walk-on
- Injured
- Current redshirt

== Schedule ==
Date time, TV	Rank^{#}	Opponent^{#}	Result	Record	High points	High rebounds	High assists	Site (attendance) city, state
Regular season
January 1916*		Moravian	W –		–	–	–	Main Building; Philadelphia, PA
January 1916*		Brooklyn Polytech	L 13–33		–	–	–	
February 4, 1916*		at Delaware	L 24–28		–	–	–	Taylor Gym; Newark, DE
February 11, 1916*		Brooklyn College						Main Building; Philadelphia, PA
February 18, 1916*		Baltimore Polytech	W 28–26		–	–	–	
Unknown*		New Jersey State Normal School						
February 26, 1916*		at Crescent Athletic Club (Brooklyn)						Second Signal Corps. Brooklyn, NY
March 2, 1916*		Lebanon Valley	L 25–26		–	–	–	Main Building; Philadelphia, PA
*Non-conference game. ^{#}Rankings from AP. (#) Tournament seedings in parentheses. All times are in Eastern Time.
