= 1918–19 Drexel Blue and Gold men's basketball team =

American college basketball season

1918–19 Drexel Blue and Gold men's basketball
- Conference: Independent
- Record: –
- Head coach: James Barrett (1st season)
- Home arena: Main Building

The 1918–19 Drexel Blue and Gold men's basketball team represented Drexel Institute of Art, Science and Industry during the 1918–19 men's basketball season. The Blue and Gold, led by 1st year head coach James Barrett, played their home games at Main Building.

== Roster ==
1918–19 Drexel Dragons men's basketball team
Players
Coaches

Pos.	#	Name	Height	Weight	Year	Previous school	Hometown
		Ellis Radcliffe	—	—
		Stanley Twoes	—	—

Head coach

- James Barrett

Assistant coach(es)

Legend

- (C) Team captain
- (S) Suspended
- (I) Ineligible
- (W) Walk-on
- Injured
- Current redshirt

== Schedule ==
Date time, TV	Rank^{#}	Opponent^{#}	Result	Record	High points	High rebounds	High assists	Site (attendance) city, state
Regular season
Unknown*		Saint Joseph's	L 17–26		–	–	–	
Unknown*		League Institute	W –		–	–	–	
*Non-conference game. ^{#}Rankings from AP. (#) Tournament seedings in parentheses. All times are in Eastern Time.
