= William L. Sayre High School =

Coordinates: 39.9582°N 75.2386°W

Location
- 5800 Walnut Street; Philadelphia, Pennsylvania 19139; United States

Information
- Type: Public high school
- Established: 1949
- School district: The School District of Philadelphia
- Principal: Jaime Eberle
- Staff: 36.20 (FTE)
- Grades: 9–12
- Enrollment: 424 (2023–2024)
- Student to teacher ratio: 11.71
- Color
- Mascot: Saber
- Website: Sayre High School

William L. Sayre High School (commonly referred to as Sayre High School) is a high school in Philadelphia and a part of the School District of Philadelphia. It was founded in 1949 as a middle school serving grades 7–9, becoming a high school in 2003. Sayre High School is also the home site of SHIELD (Sayre Health Initiatives Education and Leadership Development), a Sayre Health Center run enrichment program providing medical assistant training, health professions education, internship employment and scholarship opportunities for School District of Philadelphia high school students.
