= 1974–75 UC Irvine Anteaters men's basketball team =

American college basketball season

1974–75 UC Irvine Anteaters men's basketball

Puget Sound tournament champions

NCAA Division II Tournament, West Regional third-place game
- Conference: Independent
- Record: 16–11
- Head coach: Tim Tift (6th season)
- Home arena: Crawford Hall

The 1974–75 UC Irvine Anteaters men's basketball team represented the University of California, Irvine during the 1974–75 NCAA Division II men's basketball season. The Anteaters were led by sixth year head coach Tim Tift and played their home games at Crawford Hall. They were invited to the 1975 NCAA Division II Basketball Tournament where they lost to Puget Sound in the regional semifinals and UC Davis in the regional third-place game. The anteaters finished the season with an overall record of 16–11.

== Previous season ==
The 1973–74 UC Irvine Anteaters men's basketball team finished the season with a record of 14–12. They were not invited to a post season tournament.

== Roster ==
1974–75 UC Irvine Anteaters men's basketball team
Players
Coaches

Pos.	#	Name	Height	Weight	Year	Hometown
G		John Babcock	6 ft 3 in (1.91 m)	—	So
C		C. David Baker	6 ft 8 in (2.03 m)	—	Sr
F		Steve Cleveland	6 ft 4 in (1.93 m)	—	Jr
G		Kevin Davis	5 ft 11 in (1.8 m)	—	So
F		Bill Dowden	6 ft 4 in (1.93 m)	—	So
C		Dan Hair	6 ft 5 in (1.96 m)	—	So
G		Nate Jones	6 ft 3 in (1.91 m)	—	Jr
F		Jerry Maras	6 ft 6 in (1.98 m)	—	Sr
F		John McNeil	6 ft 5 in (1.96 m)	—	Fr
G		Rich Mraule	6 ft 2 in (1.88 m)	—	Sr
G		Tim Tivenan	6 ft 0 in (1.83 m)	—	So

Head coach

Tim Tift (Pepperdine)

Assistant coach(es)

Legend

- (C) Team captain
- (S) Suspended
- (I) Ineligible
- (W) Walk-on
- Injured
- Current redshirt

Roster

== Schedule ==
Date time, TV	Rank^{#}	Opponent^{#}	Result	Record	Site city, state
Regular Season
November 29, 1974*		South Dakota	W 101–84	1–0	Crawford Hall; Irvine, CA
December 2, 1974*		Fort Lewis	W 101–62	2–0	Crawford Hall; Irvine, CA
December 6, 1974*		Loyola Marymount; UCI Invitational	L 66–72	2–1	Crawford Hall; Irvine, CA
December 7, 1974*		Northern Arizona; UCI Invitational	W 98–95	3–1	Crawford Hall; Irvine, CA
December 13, 1974*		vs. Simon Fraser; Puget Sound Classic	W 92–72 (Note: Victory over Simon Fraser is not recognized by NCAA)	3–1	Tacoma, WA
December 14, 1974*		vs. Idaho State; Puget Sound Classic	W 91–76	4–1	Tacoma, WA
December 18, 1974*		Moorhead State	W 94–68	5–1	Crawford Hall; Irvine, CA
December 20, 1974*		North Dakota State	W 85–80	6–1	Crawford Hall; Irvine, CA
December 21, 1974*		at Utah	L 77–97	6–2	Special Events Center; Salt Lake City, UT
January 4, 1975*		Sioux Falls	W 97–55	7–2	Crawford Hall; Irvine, CA
January 6, 1975*		Puget Sound	W 83–67	8–2	Crawford Hall; Irvine, CA
January 11, 1975*		Cal State Fullerton	W 69–67	9–2	Crawford Hall; Irvine, CA
January 16, 1975*		Grand Canyon	L 63–70	9–3	Crawford Hall; Irvine, CA
January 18, 1975*		Long Beach State	L 73–82	9–4	Crawford Hall; Irvine, CA
January 21, 1975*		Loyola Marymount	L 66–79	9–5	Crawford Hall; Irvine, CA
January 24, 1975*		at UC San Diego; La Jolla Tournament	W 76–67	10–5	La Jolla, CA
January 25, 1975*		vs. UC Riverside; La Jolla Tournament	L 78–80	10–6	La Jolla, CA
February 1, 1975*		UC Santa Barbara	L 81–94	10–7	Crawford Hall; Irvine, CA
February 7, 1975*		Pomona	W 102–64	11–7	Crawford Hall; Irvine, CA
February 8, 1975*		Cal State Northridge	W 82–76	12–7	Crawford Hall; Irvine, CA
February 15, 1975*		UC Riverside	L 60–71	12–8	Crawford Hall; Irvine, CA
February 20, 1975*		Chapman	W 86–72	13–8	Crawford Hall; Irvine, CA
February 22, 1975*		Lewis & Clark	W 73–63	14–8	Crawford Hall; Irvine, CA
February 24, 1975*		Cal Poly Pomona	W 83–63	15–8	Crawford Hall; Irvine, CA
February 26, 1975*		Pacific Christian	W 101–76	16–8	Crawford Hall; Irvine, CA
February 28, 1975*		Air Force	L 59–70	16–9	Crawford Hall; Irvine, CA
NCAA Tournament
March 7, 1975*		Puget Sound regional semifinal	L 74–76	16–10	Crawford Hall; Irvine, CA
March 8, 1975*		UC Davis; Regional 3rd-place game	L 79–84	16–11	Crawford Hall; Irvine, CA
*Non-conference game. ^{#}Rankings from AP Poll. (#) Tournament seedings in parentheses. All times are in Pacific Time.
