= 1971–72 UC Irvine Anteaters men's basketball team =

American college basketball season

1971–72 UC Irvine Anteaters men's basketball

UCI Invitational Champions

NCAA College Division Tournament, West Regional third-place game
- Conference: Independent
- Record: 16–12
- Head coach: Tim Tift (3rd season)
- Home arena: Crawford Hall

The 1971–72 UC Irvine Anteaters men's basketball team represented the University of California, Irvine during the 1971–72 NCAA College Division men's basketball season. The Anteaters were led by third year head coach Tim Tift and played their home games at Crawford Hall. They were invited to the 1972 NCAA College Division basketball tournament where they lost to Southern Colorado in the regional semifinals and UC Riverside in the regional 3rd-place game. The anteaters finished the season with an overall record of 16–12.

== Previous season ==
The 1970–71 UC Irvine Anteaters men's basketball team finished the season with a record of 16–12 under second year head coach Tim Tift and were not invited to a post season tournament.

== Roster ==
1971–72 UC Irvine Anteaters men's basketball team
Players
Coaches

Pos.	#	Name	Height	Weight	Year	Hometown
G		Brad Baker	6 ft 2 in (1.88 m)	—	Sr
C		C. David Baker	6 ft 8 in (2.03 m)	—	Fr
F		Garrick Barr	6 ft 4 in (1.93 m)	—	Jr
F		Ed Burlingham	6 ft 4 in (1.93 m)	—	Sr
F		Howard Hawkins	6 ft 2 in (1.88 m)	—	So
G		Phil Mathews	6 ft 0 in (1.83 m)	—	Sr	Riverside, California
F		Bill Moore	6 ft 6 in (1.98 m)	—	Sr
G		Rick Mosier	6 ft 1 in (1.85 m)	—	So
C		Steve Parker	6 ft 6 in (1.98 m)	—	Sr
F		Eric Paulsen	6 ft 5 in (1.96 m)	—	So
F		Phil Rhyne	6 ft 5 in (1.96 m)	—	Sr
G		Troy Rolph	6 ft 0 in (1.83 m)	—	Sr

Head coach

Tim Tift (Pepperdine)

Assistant coach(es)

Legend

- (C) Team captain
- (S) Suspended
- (I) Ineligible
- (W) Walk-on
- Injured
- Current redshirt

Roster

== Schedule ==
Date time, TV	Rank^{#}	Opponent^{#}	Result	Record	Site city, state
Regular season
December 1, 1971*		at Tennessee	L 53–89	0–1	Stokely Athletic Center; Knoxville, TN
December 4, 1971*		at West Virginia	L 66–70	0–2	WVU Coliseum; Morgantown, WV
December 7, 1971*		at Army	L 71–79	0–3	Gillis Field House; West Point, NY
December 8, 1971*		at Seton Hall	L 86–94	0–4	Walsh Gymnasium; South Orange, NJ
December 11, 1971*		Wheaton	W 120–101	1–4	Crawford Hall; Irvine, CA
December 21, 1971*		Humboldt State; UCI Invitational	W 97–80	2–4	Crawford Hall; Irvine, CA
December 22, 1971*		San Diego State; UCI Invitational	W 83–77	3–4	Crawford Hall; Irvine, CA
December 23, 1971*		Seattle Pacific	W 81–65	4–4	Crawford Hall; Irvine, CA
December 29, 1971*		Seton Hall	W 98–76	5–4	Crawford Hall; Irvine, CA
December 30, 1971*		Chicago State	W 103–61	6–4	Crawford Hall; Irvine, CA
January 4, 1972*		Bethany (Oklahoma)	W 83–65	7–4	Crawford Hall; Irvine, CA
January 10, 1972*		Olivet	W 99–81	8–4	Crawford Hall; Irvine, CA
January 14, 1972*		Chapman	W 105–91	9–4	Crawford Hall; Irvine, CA
January 15, 1972*		LSU New Orleans	W 92–78	10–4	Crawford Hall; Irvine, CA
January 21, 1972*		UC Davis; All-UC Tournament	W 63–60	11–4	UC Riverside Gymnasium; Riverside, CA
January 22, 1972*		UC Riverside; All-UC Tournament	L 91–93	11–5	UC Riverside Gymnasium; Riverside, CA
January 25, 1972*		Occidental	W 94–75	12–5	Crawford Hall; Irvine, CA
January 29, 1972*		at Cal Poly Pomona	L 62–83	12–6	Kellogg Gym; Pomona, CA
February 1, 1972*		Long Beach State	L 62–83	12–7	Crawford Hall; Irvine, CA
February 3, 1972*		Puget Sound	W 86–77	13–7	Crawford Hall; Irvine, CA
February 5, 1972*		Hawaii	L 79–88	13–8	Crawford Hall; Irvine, CA
February 11, 1972*		at Chapman	W 97–90	14–8	Orange, CA
February 15, 1972*		at San Diego State	L 95–109	14–9	Peterson Gym; San Diego, CA
February 19, 1972*		UC Riverside	L 87–91	14–10	Crawford Hall; Irvine, CA
February 23, 1972*		at Stanislaus State	W 89–85	15–10	Turlock, CA
February 26, 1972*		Cal State Bakersfield	W 81–76	16–10	Crawford Hall; Irvine, CA
NCAA Tournament
March 10, 1972*		at Southern Colorado; Regional semifinal	L 58–77	16–11	Massari Arena; Pueblo, CO
March 11, 1972*		vs. UC Riverside; Regional 3rd-place game	L 75–94	16–12	Massari Arena; Pueblo, CO
*Non-conference game. ^{#}Rankings from AP Poll. (#) Tournament seedings in parentheses. All times are in Pacific Time.
