= 1969–70 UC Irvine Anteaters men's basketball team =

American college basketball season

1969–70 UC Irvine Anteaters men's basketball
- Conference: Independent
- Record: 17–9
- Head coach: Tim Tift (1st season)
- Home arena: Crawford Hall

The 1969–70 UC Irvine Anteaters men's basketball team represented the University of California, Irvine during the 1969–70 NCAA College Division men's basketball season. The Anteaters were led by first year head coach Tim Tift and played their home games at Crawford Hall. The anteaters finished the season with a record 17–9.

== Previous season ==
The 1967–68 UC Irvine Anteaters finished with a record of 19–9 under second year coach Dick Davis. They were invited to the 1969 NCAA College Division basketball tournament where they lost to the San Francisco State Gators in the regional semifinals and defeated theUC Davis Aggies in the regional third place game. The anteaters finished the season with a record 19–9. At the end of the season, head coach Dick Davis accepted the head coach position at San Diego State and frosh coach Tim Tift was promoted to replace him as the anteater's head coach.

== Roster ==
1969–70 UC Irvine Anteaters men's basketball team
Players
Coaches

Pos.	#	Name	Height	Weight	Year	Hometown
G		Brad Baker	6 ft 2 in (1.88 m)	—	So
G		Mike Barnes	5 ft 10 in (1.78 m)	—	Sr
G		Keith Bean	6 ft 2 in (1.88 m)	—	Jr
F		Ed Burlingham	6 ft 4 in (1.93 m)	—	So
F		Jeff Cunningham	6 ft 4 in (1.93 m)	—	Sr
F		John Farwell	6 ft 4 in (1.93 m)	—	Jr
G		Gary Fox	6 ft 3 in (1.91 m)	—	So
C		Bill George	6 ft 7 in (2.01 m)	—	So
G		John Glavinovich	6 ft 5 in (1.96 m)	—	Sr
C		Les Mingo	6 ft 8 in (2.03 m)	—	Jr
F		Bill Moore	6 ft 6 in (1.98 m)	—	So
G		Steve Sabins	6 ft 4 in (1.93 m)	—	Sr
F		Robbie Sagehorn	6 ft 4 in (1.93 m)	—	So
G		Larry Wasserman	5 ft 9 in (1.75 m)	—	So

Head coach

Tim Tift (Pepperdine)

Assistant coach(es)

Legend

- (C) Team captain
- (S) Suspended
- (I) Ineligible
- (W) Walk-on
- Injured
- Current redshirt

Roster

== Schedule ==
Date time, TV	Rank^{#}	Opponent^{#}	Result	Record	Site city, state
Regular Season
December 1, 1969*		at Nebraska	L 73–76	0–1	Nebraska Coliseum; Lincoln, NE
December 3, 1969*		at Colorado	L 65–80	0–2	Balch Fieldhouse; Boulder, CO
December 6, 1969*		Cal State LA	L 87–90 ^{OT}	0–3	Crawford Hall; Irvine, CA
December 13, 1969*		at San Diego State	L 68–80	0–4	Peterson Gym; San Diego, CA
December 26, 1969*		Tahoe College; UCI Invitational	W 98–74	1–4	Crawford Hall; Irvine, CA
December 27, 1969*		Cal State Fullerton; UCI Invitational	W 86–65	2–4	Crawford Hall; Irvine, CA
December 29, 1969*		Northern Arizona; UCI Invitational	L 84–86	2–5	Crawford Hall; Irvine, CA
January 3, 1970*		San Francisco State	W 95–81	3–5	Crawford Hall; Irvine, CA
January 7, 1970*		John F. Kennedy	W 95–81	4–5	Crawford Hall; Irvine, CA
January 9, 1970*		Cal State Fullerton	W 84–79	5–5	Crawford Hall; Irvine, CA
January 16, 1970*		at UC Riverside	L 95–97	5–6	UC Riverside Gymnasium; Riverside, CA
January 17, 1970*		at Cal Poly Pomona	W 72–70	6–6	Kellogg Gym; Pomona, CA
January 23, 1970*		at UC Davis; UC Davis Tournament	L 73–91	6–7	Davis, CA
January 24, 1970*		vs. UC Riverside; UC Davis Tournament	W 86–70	7–7	Davis, CA
January 30, 1970*		San Fernando Valley State	W 92–83	8–7	Crawford Hall; Irvine, CA
January 31, 1970*		Cal Poly	W 85–72	9–7	Crawford Hall; Irvine, CA
February 4, 1970*		at Chapman	W 77–66	10–7	Orange, CA
February 6, 1970*		San Jose State	W 91–80	11–7	Crawford Hall; Irvine, CA
February 10, 1970*		UC San Diego	W 94–80	12–7	Crawford Hall; Irvine, CA
February 13, 1970*		at Cal State Fullerton	W 70–68	13–7	Titan Gym; Fullerton, CA
February 17, 1970*		Chapman	W 74–72	14–7	Crawford Hall; Irvine, CA
February 20, 1970*		UC Riverside	L 76–78	14–8	Crawford Hall; Irvine, CA
February 21, 1970*		Cal Poly Pomona	W 99–91	15–8	Crawford Hall; Irvine, CA
February 23, 1970*		Cal State Stanislaus	W 102–74	16–8	Crawford Hall; Irvine, CA
February 27, 1970*		at San Fernando Valley State	W 86–75	17–8	Matadome; Northridge, CA
February 28, 1970*		Cal Poly	L 88–103	17–9	Mott Gym; San Luis Obispo, CA
*Non-conference game. ^{#}Rankings from AP Poll. (#) Tournament seedings in parentheses. All times are in Pacific Time.
