= 1972–73 UC Irvine Anteaters men's basketball team =

American college basketball season

1972–73 UC Irvine Anteaters men's basketball

UCI Invitational champion
- Conference: Independent
- Record: 15–13
- Head coach: Tim Tift (4th season)
- Home arena: Crawford Hall

The 1972–73 UC Irvine Anteaters men's basketball team represented the University of California, Irvine during the 1972–73 NCAA College Division men's basketball season. The Anteaters were led by fourth year head coach Tim Tift and played their home games at Crawford Hall. The Anteaters finished the season with an overall record of 15–13 and were not invited to a post season tournament.

== Previous season ==
The 1971–72 UC Irvine Anteaters men's basketball team finished the season with a record of 16–12. They were invited to the 1972 NCAA College Division basketball tournament where they lost to Southern Colorado in the regional semifinals and UC Riverside in the regional 3rd place game.

== Roster ==
1972–73 UC Irvine Anteaters men's basketball team
Players
Coaches

Pos.	#	Name	Height	Weight	Year	Hometown
C		C. David Baker	6 ft 8 in (2.03 m)	—	So
G		Sam Bunch	6 ft 0 in (1.83 m)	—	So
F		Richard Clark	6 ft 6 in (1.98 m)	—	Sr
F		Gary Denton	6 ft 5 in (1.96 m)	—	So
F		Gary Eubanks	6 ft 3 in (1.91 m)	—	So
C		Scott Magnuson	7 ft 0 in (2.13 m)	—	Jr
F		Jerry Maras	6 ft 6 in (1.98 m)	—	So
F		Marc Martinez	6 ft 6 in (1.98 m)	—	Fr
G		Rich Mraule	6 ft 2 in (1.88 m)	—	Jr
G		Scott Palmer	6 ft 2 in (1.88 m)	—	Fr
F		Eric Paulsen	6 ft 5 in (1.96 m)	—	Jr
G		Harlan Peet	6 ft 4 in (1.93 m)	—	Jr

Head coach

Tim Tift (Pepperdine)

Assistant coach(es)

Legend

- (C) Team captain
- (S) Suspended
- (I) Ineligible
- (W) Walk-on
- Injured
- Current redshirt

Roster

== Schedule ==
Date time, TV	Rank^{#}	Opponent^{#}	Result	Record	Site city, state
Regular Season
November 25, 1972*		at Minnesota	L 71–93	0–1	Williams Arena; Minneapolis, MN
November 27, 1972*		at North Dakota State	W 62–56	1–1	Bison Sports Arena; Fargo, ND
December 1, 1972*		at Hawaii	L 75–99	1–2	Neal S. Blaisdell Center; Honolulu, HI
December 2, 1972*		at Hawaii	L 82–99	1–3	Neal S. Blaisdell Center; Honolulu, HI
December 9, 1972*		Montana State	W 82–76	2–3	Crawford Hall; Irvine, CA
December 16, 1972*		John Brown	W 83–70	3–3	Crawford Hall; Irvine, CA
December 19, 1972*		Central	W 74–61	4–3	Crawford Hall; Irvine, CA
December 22, 1972*		vs. Loyola Marymount; International City Classic	L 58–92	4–4	Long Beach Arena; Long Beach, CA
December 23, 1972*		vs. Long Island; International City Classic	W 67–65	5–4	Long Beach Arena; Long Beach, CA
December 27, 1972*		North Park	W 74–64	6–4	Crawford Hall; Irvine, CA
December 29, 1972*		Humboldt State; UCI Invitational	W 74–67	7–4	Crawford Hall; Irvine, CA
December 30, 1972*		Cal State Northridge; UCI Invitational	W 83–75	8–4	Crawford Hall; Irvine, CA
January 2, 1973*		Taylor	W 80–79	9–4	Crawford Hall; Irvine, CA
January 3, 1973*		Macalester Scots	W 72–63	10–4	Crawford Hall; Irvine, CA
January 9, 1973*		at Montana State	L 59–75	10–5	MSU Fieldhouse; Bozeman, MT
January 11, 1973*		at Idaho State	L 49–61	10–6	Holt Arena; Pocatello, ID
January 13, 1973*		at Puget Sound	L 49–55	10–7	Tacoma, WA
January 19, 1973*		UC San Diego; All-Cal Tournament	W 69–63	11–7	Crawford Hall; Irvine, CA
January 20, 1973*		UC Riverside; All-Cal Tournament	W 69–68	12–7	Crawford Hall; Irvine, CA
January 27, 1973*		Stanislaus State	W 86–71	13–7	Crawford Hall; Irvine, CA
January 30, 1973*		Cal Poly Pomona	L 66–70	13–8	Crawford Hall; Irvine, CA
February 1, 1973*		Cal State Fullerton	L 64–70	13–9	Crawford Hall; Irvine, CA
February 3, 1973*		Cal State Northridge	L 59–65	13–10	Crawford Hall; Irvine, CA
February 6, 1973*		at Chapman	W 80–72	14–10	Orange, CA
February 13, 1973*		at UC Riverside	L 65–69	14–11	UC Riverside Gymnasium; Riverside, CA
February 17, 1973*		at Cal State Northridge	L 63–64	14–12	Matadome; Northridge, CA
February 23, 1973*		Chapman	W 73–61	15–12	Crawford Hall; Irvine, CA
February 27, 1973*		at Cal State Fullerton	L 76–92	15–13	Titan Gym; Fullerton, CA
*Non-conference game. ^{#}Rankings from AP Poll. (#) Tournament seedings in parentheses. All times are in Pacific Time.
