= 1975–76 UC Irvine Anteaters men's basketball team =

American college basketball season

1975–76 UC Irvine Anteaters men's basketball
- Conference: Independent
- Record: 14–12
- Head coach: Tim Tift (7th season)
- Home arena: Crawford Hall

The 1975–76 UC Irvine Anteaters men's basketball team represented the University of California, Irvine during the 1975–76 NCAA Division II men's basketball season. The Anteaters were led by seventh year head coach Tim Tift and played their home games at Crawford Hall. The anteaters finished the season with an overall record of 14–12 and were not invited to a post season tournament.

== Previous season ==
The 1974–75 UC Irvine Anteaters men's basketball team were invited to the 1975 NCAA Division II Basketball Tournament where they lost to Puget Sound in the regional semifinals and UC Davis in the regional third place game. The anteaters finished the season with a record of 16–11.

== Roster ==
1975–76 UC Irvine Anteaters men's basketball team
Players
Coaches

| Pos. | # | Name | Height | Weight | Year | Hometown |
|---|---|---|---|---|---|---|
| F | | Bill Beckford | 6 ft 4 in (1.93 m) | — | Jr |
| F | | Mark Bonvecchio | 6 ft 5 in (1.96 m) | — | Jr |
| F | | Jeff Butler | 6 ft 5 in (1.96 m) | — | Sr |
| G | | Kevin Davis | 5 ft 11 in (1.8 m) | — | Jr |
| F | | Steve Cleveland | 6 ft 4 in (1.93 m) | — | Sr |
| C | | Mike Fitzmorris | 6 ft 7 in (2.01 m) | — | So |
| C | | Dan Hair | 6 ft 5 in (1.96 m) | — | Jr |
| F | | Scott Jenkins | 6 ft 4 in (1.93 m) | — | Jr |
| G | | Nate Jones | 6 ft 3 in (1.91 m) | — | Sr |
| G | | Dorsey Watson | 6 ft 3 in (1.91 m) | — | So |
| G | | Bill Younge | 6 ft 3 in (1.91 m) | — | Jr |

Head coach

Tim Tift (Pepperdine)

Assistant coach(es)

Legend

- (C) Team captain
- (S) Suspended
- (I) Ineligible
- (W) Walk-on
- Injured
- Current redshirt

Roster

== Schedule ==
| Date time, TV | Rank^{#} | Opponent^{#} | Result | Record | Site city, state |
Regular Season
| December 3, 1975* | | Humboldt State | W 67–46 | 1–0 | Crawford Hall; Irvine, CA |
| December 6, 1975* | | Southern California College | W 101–77 | 2–0 | Crawford Hall; Irvine, CA |
| December 13, 1975* | | Pacific Christian | W 70–60 | 3–0 | Crawford Hall; Irvine, CA |
| December 16, 1975* | | at UNLV | L 57–129 | 3–1 | Las Vegas Convention Center; Paradise, NV |
| December 18, 1975* | | at North Dakota State | L 84–95 | 3–2 | Bison Sports Arena; Fargo, ND |
| December 20, 1975* | | at North Dakota | L 69–95 | 3–3 | Hyslop Sports Center; Grand Forks, ND |
| December 22, 1975* | | at Utah | L 55–90 | 3–4 | Special Events Center; Salt Lake City, UT |
| December 29, 1975* | | Central | W 81–71 | 4–4 | Crawford Hall; Irvine, CA |
| December 30, 1975* | | Spring Arbor | W 96–58 | 5–4 | Crawford Hall; Irvine, CA |
| January 3, 1976* | | Cal State Northridge | W 84–73 | 6–4 | Crawford Hall; Irvine, CA |
| January 6, 1976* | | Bethany | W 61–56 | 7–4 | Crawford Hall; Irvine, CA |
| January 10, 1976* | | at Grand Canyon | L 70–83 | 7–5 | Phoenix, AZ |
| January 14, 1976* | | at San Diego | L 75–86 | 7–6 | San Diego, CA |
| January 17, 1976* | | Cal Poly | L 54–58 | 7–7 | Crawford Hall; Irvine, CA |
| January 24, 1976* | | Ambassador | W 63–48 | 8–7 | Crawford Hall; Irvine, CA |
| January 27, 1976* | | UC Riverside | W 70–69 | 9–7 | Crawford Hall; Irvine, CA |
| January 31, 1976* | | UC Davis | L 72–84 | 9–8 | Crawford Hall; Irvine, CA |
| February 6, 1976* | | San Diego | W 78–66 | 10–8 | Crawford Hall; Irvine, CA |
| February 7, 1976* | | Biola | L 73–76 | 10–9 | Crawford Hall; Irvine, CA |
| February 10, 1976* | | at Cal State Northridge | L 68–84 | 10–10 | Matadome; Northridge, CA |
| February 14, 1976* | | at LA Baptist | W 103–91 | 11–10 | Los Angeles, CA |
| February 17, 1976* | | at Ambassador | W 65–61 | 12–10 | Pasadena, CA |
| February 21, 1976* | | Chapman | W 66–64 | 13–10 | Crawford Hall; Irvine, CA |
| February 23, 1976* | | Cal State Dominguez Hills | W 85–69 | 14–10 | Crawford Hall; Irvine, CA |
| February 25, 1976* | | Portland State | L 72–87 | 14–11 | Crawford Hall; Irvine, CA |
| February 28, 1976* | | Air Force | L 76–77 | 14–12 | Crawford Hall; Irvine, CA |
*Non-conference game. ^{#}Rankings from AP Poll. (#) Tournament seedings in parentheses. All times are in Pacific Time.
