= 1968–69 UC Irvine Anteaters men's basketball team =

American college basketball season

1968–69 UC Irvine Anteaters men's basketball

NCAA College Division Tournament, Far West Regional third-place game
- Conference: Independent
- Record: 19–9
- Head coach: Dick Davis (2nd season)
- Home arena: Crawford Hall

The 1968–69 UC Irvine Anteaters men's basketball team represented the University of California, Irvine during the 1968–69 NCAA College Division men's basketball season. The Anteaters were led by second year head coach Dick Davis and played their home games at Crawford Hall. They were invited to the 1969 NCAA College Division basketball tournament where they lost to the San Francisco State Gators in the regional semifinals and defeated theUC Davis Aggies in the regional third-place game. The anteaters finished the season with a record 19–9.

== Previous season ==
The 1966–67 UC Irvine Anteaters finished with a record of 20–8 under first year coach Dick Davis. The Anteaters were invited to the 1968 NCAA College Division basketball tournament and lost in the regional finals to the Nevada Southern Rebels.

== Roster ==
1968–69 UC Irvine Anteaters men's basketball team
Players
Coaches

Pos.	#	Name	Height	Weight	Year	Hometown
G		Mike Barnes	5 ft 10 in (1.78 m)	—	Jr
G		Keith Bean	6 ft 2 in (1.88 m)	—	So
F		Jeff Cunningham	6 ft 4 in (1.93 m)	—	Jr
G		Jim Farley	6 ft 2 in (1.88 m)	—	Jr
F		John Farwell	6 ft 4 in (1.93 m)	—	So
F		Dave Fontius	6 ft 9 in (2.06 m)	—	Sr
G		John Glavinovich	6 ft 5 in (1.96 m)	—	Jr
C		Mike Heckman	6 ft 7 in (2.01 m)	—	Sr
G		Steve Sabins	6 ft 4 in (1.93 m)	—	Jr
F		Nick Sanden	6 ft 5 in (1.96 m)	—	Sr
C		Gene Zech	6 ft 6 in (1.98 m)	—	Jr

Head coach

Dick Davis

Assistant coach(es)

Legend

- (C) Team captain
- (S) Suspended
- (I) Ineligible
- (W) Walk-on
- Injured
- Current redshirt

Roster

== Schedule ==
Date time, TV	Rank^{#}	Opponent^{#}	Result	Record	Site city, state
Regular Season
November 30, 1968*		UC San Diego	W 92–72	1–0	Crawford Hall; Irvine, CA
December 5, 1968*		vs. La Verne; Redlands Tournament	W 80–57	2–0	Currier Gym; Redlands, CA
December 6, 1968*		vs. Claremont-Mudd; Redlands Tournament	W 76–41	3–0	Currier Gym; Redlands, CA
December 7, 1968*		vs. Pasadena; Redlands Tournament	W 61–59	4–0	Currier Gym; Redlands, CA
December 19, 1968*		vs. Alma; Cal Western Tournament	L 79–80 ^{OT}	4–1	San Diego, CA
December 20, 1968*		vs. Northern Arizona; Cal Western Tournament	W 99–88	5–1	San Diego, CA
December 21, 1968*		vs. Pomona; Cal Western Tournament	W 74–57	6–1	San Diego, CA
December 26, 1968*		Redlands; UCI Invitational	W 101–55	7–1	Crawford Hall; Irvine, CA
December 27, 1968*		Cal State LA; UCI Invitational	W 92–81	8–1	Crawford Hall; Irvine, CA
December 28, 1968*		Long Beach State; UCI Invitational	L 60–61	8–2	Crawford Hall; Irvine, CA
January 2, 1969*		at Providence	L 77–85	8–3	Alumni Hall; Providence, RI
January 3, 1969*		at Rhode Island	L 76–81	8–4	Keaney Gymnasium; Kingston, RI
January 7, 1969*		at Boston College	L 79–95	8–5	Roberts Center; Chestnut Hill, MA
January 11, 1969*		Westmont	W 99–93	9–5	Crawford Hall; Irvine, CA
January 14, 1969*		UC Riverside	W 106–78	10–5	Crawford Hall; Irvine, CA
January 17, 1969*		Chapman	W 72–70	11–5	Crawford Hall; Irvine, CA
January 23, 1969*		UC Davis	W 99–89	12–5	Crawford Hall; Irvine, CA
January 28, 1969*		at Fresno State	L 66–86	12–6	Selland Arena; Fresno, CA
February 1, 1969*		Cal State Fullerton	W 89–73	13–6	Crawford Hall; Irvine, CA
February 4, 1969*		at UC San Diego	W 78–72	14–6	San Diego, CA
February 11, 1969*		at Loyola Marymount	L 75–83	14–7	Los Angeles, CA
February 15, 1969*		at Chapman	W 97–76	15–7	Orange, CA
February 18, 1969*		at UC Riverside	L 85–92	15–8	UC Riverside Gymnasium; Riverside, CA
February 22, 1969*		at Westmont	W 101–86	16–8	Montecito, CA
February 25, 1969*		San Diego State	W 89–56	17–8	Crawford Hall; Irvine, CA
February 28, 1969*		Tahoe College	W 100–85	18–8	Crawford Hall; Irvine, CA
NCAA Tournament
March 7, 1969*		vs. San Francisco State regional semifinal	L 55–81	18–9	Las Vegas Convention Center; Winchester, NV
March 8, 1969*		vs. UC Davis; Regional third-place game	W 82–70	19–9	Las Vegas Convention Center; Winchester, NV
*Non-conference game. ^{#}Rankings from AP Poll. (#) Tournament seedings in parentheses. All times are in Pacific Time.
