= 1976–77 UC Irvine Anteaters men's basketball team =

American college basketball season

1976–77 UC Irvine Anteaters men's basketball
- Conference: Independent
- Record: 10–17
- Head coach: Tim Tift (8th season)
- Home arena: Crawford Hall

The 1976–77 UC Irvine Anteaters men's basketball team represented the University of California, Irvine during the 1976–77 NCAA Division II men's basketball season. The Anteaters were led by eight year head coach Tim Tift and played their home games at Crawford Hall. The anteaters finished the season with an overall record of 10–17 and were not invited to a post season tournament.

== Previous season ==
The 1975–76 UC Irvine Anteaters men's basketball team finished the season with an overall record of 14–12 and did not receive a post season tournament invitation.

== Roster ==
1976–77 UC Irvine Anteaters men's basketball team
Players
Coaches

Pos.	#	Name	Height	Weight	Year	Hometown
G		Ben Carson	6 ft 0 in (1.83 m)	—	Fr
C		Frank Chandler	6 ft 7 in (2.01 m)	—	Jr
F		Kirk Christ	6 ft 6 in (1.98 m)	—	Jr
F		Leo Gonzalez	6 ft 6 in (1.98 m)	—	Jr
C		Dan Hair	6 ft 6 in (1.98 m)	—	Sr
F		Scott Jenkins	6 ft 5 in (1.96 m)	—	Sr
G		Terry Lovingler	6 ft 4 in (1.93 m)	—	So
C		David Knudsen	6 ft 7 in (2.01 m)	—	Fr
F		Steve Rodgers	6 ft 6 in (1.98 m)	—	Fr
G		Louis Stephens	6 ft 4 in (1.93 m)	—	Jr
G		Tim Tivenan	5 ft 11 in (1.8 m)	—	Sr

Head coach

Tim Tift (Pepperdine)

Assistant coach(es)

Legend

- (C) Team captain
- (S) Suspended
- (I) Ineligible
- (W) Walk-on
- Injured
- Current redshirt

Roster

== Schedule ==
Date time, TV	Rank^{#}	Opponent^{#}	Result	Record	Site (attendance) city, state
Regular Season
November 30, 1976*		at Long Beach State	L 54–87	0–1	Long Beach Arena (3,950); Long Beach, CA
December 3, 1976*		UC San Diego	W 108–84	1–1	Crawford Hall (950); Irvine, CA
December 6, 1976*		North Dakota	L 68–75	1–2	Crawford Hall (300); Irvine, CA
December 14, 1976*		at Biola	L 52–64	1–3	Chase Gymnasium (300); La Mirada, CA
December 17, 1976*		at UC Riverside	W 69–66	2–3	UC Riverside Gymnasium (600); Riverside, CA
December 18, 1976*		North Park	W 66–59	3–3	Crawford Hall (300); Irvine, CA
December 20, 1976*		Seattle Pacific	W 67–58	4–3	Crawford Hall (350); Irvine, CA
December 23, 1976*		at Cal State Fullerton	L 55–74	4–4	Titan Gym (1,305); Fullerton, CA
December 29, 1976*		at Boise State; Boise State Classic	L 55–76	4–5	Bronco Gymnasium (3,015); Boise, ID
December 30, 1976*		vs. Sacramento State; Boise State Classic	L 59–82	4–6	Bronco Gymnasium (3,015); Boise, ID
January 5, 1977*		Santa Fe	W 89–64	5–6	Crawford Hall (400); Irvine, CA
January 7, 1977*		at UC Davis	L 77–79	5–7	Davis, CA
January 10, 1977*		Puget Sound	L 40–51	5–8	Crawford Hall (350); Irvine, CA
January 13, 1977*		UMKC	W 79–69	6–8	Crawford Hall (600); Irvine, CA
January 15, 1977*		Northern Colorado	L 59–62	6–9	Crawford Hall (975); Irvine, CA
January 18, 1977*		Cal State Northridge	W 80–66	7–9	Crawford Hall (350); Irvine, CA
January 22, 1977*		San Diego	W 65–57	8–9	Crawford Hall (1,100); Irvine, CA
January 25, 1977*		at Northern Arizona	L 73–80	8–10	(3,164); Flagstaff, AZ
February 1, 1977*		Chico State	W 54–52	9–10	Crawford Hall (600); Irvine, CA
February 3, 1977*		at Creighton	L 71–93	9–11	Omaha Civic Auditorium (4,614); Omaha, NE
February 5, 1977*		Cal State Bakersfield	L 86–98	9–12	Crawford Hall (500); Irvine, CA
February 8, 1977*		UC Riverside	L 48–68	9–13	Crawford Hall (750); Irvine, CA
February 12, 1977*		at Cal Poly	L 64–86	9–14	Mott Gym (750); San Luis Obispo, CA
February 15, 1977*		at Cal State Northridge	L 66–84	9–15	Matadome (500); Northridge, CA
February 18, 1977*		LA Baptist	W 105–55	10–15	Crawford Hall (450); Irvine, CA
February 19, 1977*		at San Diego	L 67–83	10–16	(900); San Diego, CA
February 26, 1977*		at Chapman	L 64–74	10–17	(1,038); Orange, CA
*Non-conference game. ^{#}Rankings from AP Poll. (#) Tournament seedings in parentheses. All times are in Pacific Time.
