= 1966–67 UC Irvine Anteaters men's basketball team =

American college basketball season

1966–67 UC Irvine Anteaters men's basketball

Pomona Invitational Champions
- Conference: Independent
- Record: 15–11
- Head coach: Danny Rogers (2nd season)
- Home arena: Campus Hall

The 1966–67 UC Irvine Anteaters men's basketball team represented the University of California, Irvine during the 1966–67 NCAA College Division men's basketball season. The Anteaters were led by second year head coach Danny Rogers and played their home games at Campus Hall. They finished their second season 15–11.

== Previous season ==
In their inaugural season of intercollegiate athletics, the 1965–66 Anteaters finished with a record of 15–11.

== Roster ==
1966–67 UC Irvine Anteaters men's basketball team
Players
Coaches

Pos.	#	Name	Height	Weight	Year	Hometown
		Charlie Brandt	—	—
		Tom Bryan	—	—
		Doug Christie	—	—
		Dale Finney	—	—
		Dave Fontius	—	—
		Mike Heckman	—	—
		Fred Kern	—	—
		Eldon McBride	—	—
		Darrell Milner	—	—
		Mark Nelson	—	—
		Nick Sanden	—	—
		Jim Splittberger	—	—

Head coach

Danny Rogers

Assistant coach(es)

Legend

- (C) Team captain
- (S) Suspended
- (I) Ineligible
- (W) Walk-on
- Injured
- Current redshirt

Roster

== Schedule ==
Date time, TV	Rank^{#}	Opponent^{#}	Result	Record	Site (attendance) city, state
Regular Season
December 1, 1966*		Nevada Southern	L 65–75 ^{2OT}	0–1	Campus Hall; Irvine, CA
December 2, 1966*		at Long Beach State	L 80–86 ^{OT}	0–2	Gold Mine; Long Beach, CA
December 9, 1966*		Cal State Fullerton	W 82–72	1–2	Campus Hall; Irvine, CA
December 16, 1966*		vs. Hasting College; Pomona Invitational	W 87–55	2–2	Pomona, CA
December 17, 1966*		vs. Puget Sound; Pomona Invitational	W 83–76	3–2	Pomona, CA
December 20, 1966*		Westmont	W 93–87	4–2	Campus Hall; Irvine, CA
December 23, 1966*		at San Fernando Valley State	L 81–89	4–3	Matadome; Northridge, CA
December 27, 1966*		vs. San Fernando Valley State; Chapman Tournament	L 82–87	4–4	Orange, CA
December 28, 1966*		vs. Westmont; Chapman Tournament	W 79–74	5–4	Orange, CA
December 29, 1966*		vs. Long Beach State; Chapman Tournament	W 90–82	6–4	Orange, CA
January 5, 1967*		at Portland	L 73–77	6–5	Portland, OR
January 6, 1967*		at Portland	L 76–99	6–6	Portland, OR
January 10, 1967*		Cal Lutheran	W 69–61	7–6	Campus Hall; Irvine, CA
January 13, 1967*		at Cal State Hayward	L 73–88	7–7	Hayward, CA
January 14, 1967*		at UC Davis	W 81–66	8–7	Davis, CA
January 17, 1967*		UC Riverside	W 82–75 ^{OT}	9–7	Campus Hall; Irvine, CA
January 21, 1967*		at Chapman	W 82–74	10–7	Orange, CA
January 24, 1967*		Cal Western	L 70–80	10–8	Campus Hall; Irvine, CA
January 30, 1967*		Long Beach State	W 90–73	11–8	Campus Hall; Irvine, CA
February 3, 1967*		San Fernando Valley State	W 96–76	12–8	Campus Hall; Irvine, CA
February 7, 1967*		at Westmont	L 76–88	12–9	Montecito, CA
February 10, 1967*		at Nevada Southern	L 77–87	12–10	NSU Gym; Paradise, NV
February 15, 1967*		Chapman	W 60–59	13–10	Campus Hall; Irvine, CA
February 17, 1967*		at UC Riverside	L 61–78	13–11	UC Riverside Gymnasium; Riverside, CA
February 20, 1967*		at Cal State Fullerton	W 98–72	14–11	Titan Gym; Fullerton, CA
February 25, 1967*		San Diego	W 70–64 ^{OT}	15–11	Campus Hall; Irvine, CA
*Non-conference game. ^{#}Rankings from AP Poll. (#) Tournament seedings in parentheses. All times are in Pacific Time.
