= 1973–74 UC Irvine Anteaters men's basketball team =

American college basketball season

1973–74 UC Irvine Anteaters men's basketball

UCI Invitational Champions
- Conference: Independent
- Record: 14–12
- Head coach: Tim Tift (5th season)
- Home arena: Crawford Hall

The 1973–74 UC Irvine Anteaters men's basketball team represented the University of California, Irvine during the 1973–74 NCAA Division II men's basketball season. The Anteaters were led by fifth year head coach Tim Tift and played their home games at Crawford Hall. The anteaters finished the season with an overall record of 14–12 and were not invited to a post season tournament.

== Previous season ==
The 1972–73 UC Irvine Anteaters men's basketball team finished the season with a record of 15–13. They were not invited to a post season tournament.

== Roster ==
1973–74 UC Irvine Anteaters men's basketball team
Players
Coaches

Pos.	#	Name	Height	Weight	Year	Hometown
C		C. David Baker	6 ft 8 in (2.03 m)	—	Jr
F		Jeff Butler	6 ft 5 in (1.96 m)	—	Jr
G		Kevin Davis	5 ft 11 in (1.8 m)	—	Fr
F		Gary Eubanks	6 ft 3 in (1.91 m)	—	Jr
F		Howard Hawkins	6 ft 2 in (1.88 m)	—	Sr
C		Scott Magnuson	7 ft 0 in (2.13 m)	—	Sr
F		Jerry Maras	6 ft 6 in (1.98 m)	—	Jr
G		Rich Mraule	6 ft 2 in (1.88 m)	—	Jr
G		Bill Pallwitz	6 ft 1 in (1.85 m)	—	Jr
G		Sam Pope	6 ft 0 in (1.83 m)	—	Sr
G		Tim Tivenan	6 ft 0 in (1.83 m)	—	Fr

Head coach

Tim Tift (Pepperdine)

Assistant coach(es)

Legend

- (C) Team captain
- (S) Suspended
- (I) Ineligible
- (W) Walk-on
- Injured
- Current redshirt

Roster

== Schedule ==
Date time, TV	Rank^{#}	Opponent^{#}	Result	Record	Site city, state
Regular Season
November 30, 1973*		vs. Loyola Marymount; Cal Poly Pomona Tournament	L 70–76	0–1	Kellogg Gym; Pomona, CA
December 1, 1973*		at Cal Poly Pomona; Cal Poly Pomona Tournament	W 98–80	1–1	Kellogg Gym; Pomona, CA
December 7, 1973*		Idaho State	L 74–92	1–2	Crawford Hall; Irvine, CA
December 17, 1973*		Wheaton	W 82–75	2–2	Crawford Hall; Irvine, CA
December 19, 1973*		Moorhead State	W 83–73	3–2	Crawford Hall; Irvine, CA
December 22, 1973*		North Dakota State	W 81–74	4–2	Crawford Hall; Irvine, CA
December 28, 1973*		Puget Sound; UCI Invitational	W 82–64	5–2	Crawford Hall; Irvine, CA
December 29, 1973*		Cal State Fullerton; UCI Invitational	W 78–60	6–2	Crawford Hall; Irvine, CA
January 4, 1974*		Saint Joseph's	L 64–66	6–3	Crawford Hall; Irvine, CA
January 8, 1974*		Bethany	W 81–74	7–3	Crawford Hall; Irvine, CA
January 10, 1974*		Quinnipiac	W 96–74	8–3	Crawford Hall; Irvine, CA
January 12, 1974*		at Providence	L 51–75	8–4	Providence Civic Center; Providence, RI
January 14, 1974*		at Old Dominion	L 77–84	8–5	Hampton Coliseum; Hampton, VA
January 16, 1974*		at Richmond	L 73–79	8–6	Robins Center; Richmond, VA
January 22, 1974*		Cal State Northridge	W 73–71	9–6	Crawford Hall; Irvine, CA
January 25, 1974*		Long Beach State	L 58–82	9–7	Crawford Hall; Irvine, CA
February 1, 1974*		Cal State Dominguez Hills	W 104–65	10–7	Crawford Hall; Irvine, CA
February 2, 1974*		Chapman	W 68–55	11–7	Crawford Hall; Irvine, CA
February 5, 1974*		Southern California College	W 58–53	12–7	Crawford Hall; Irvine, CA
February 8, 1974*		at Cal State Northridge	W 77–74	13–7	Matadome; Northridge, CA
February 9, 1974*		UC Riverside	L 73–75	13–8	Crawford Hall; Irvine, CA
February 12, 1974*		at Portland State	L 64–68	13–9	Portland, OR
February 14, 1974*		at Seattle Pacific	L 59–68	13–10	Seattle, WA
February 16, 1974*		at Puget Sound	L 78–89	13–11	Tacoma, WA
February 19, 1974*		Creighton	L 52–83	13–12	Crawford Hall; Irvine, CA
February 22, 1974*		at Chapman	W 85–73	14–12	Orange, CA
*Non-conference game. ^{#}Rankings from AP Poll. (#) Tournament seedings in parentheses. All times are in Pacific Time.
