= 1970–71 UC Irvine Anteaters men's basketball team =

American college basketball season

1970–71 UC Irvine Anteaters men's basketball

Kris Kringle Klassic Champions
- Conference: Independent
- Record: 16–10
- Head coach: Tim Tift (2nd season)
- Home arena: Crawford Hall

The 1970–71 UC Irvine Anteaters men's basketball team represented the University of California, Irvine during the 1970–71 NCAA College Division men's basketball season. The Anteaters were led by second year head coach Tim Tift and played their home games at Crawford Hall. The anteaters finished the season with a record 16–10.

== Previous season ==
After previous head coach Dick Davis accepted the head coaching position at San Diego State, frosh coach Tim Tift was hired to be his replacement. The anteaters finished the season with a record 17–9 and were not invited to a post season tournament.

== Roster ==
1970–71 UC Irvine Anteaters men's basketball team
Players
Coaches

Pos.	#	Name	Height	Weight	Year	Hometown
G		Brad Baker	6 ft 2 in (1.88 m)	—	Jr
F		Ed Burlingham	6 ft 4 in (1.93 m)	—	Jr
C		Richard Clark	6 ft 5 in (1.96 m)	—	Jr
F		John Farwell	6 ft 4 in (1.93 m)	—	Sr
G		Gary Fox	6 ft 3 in (1.91 m)	—	Jr
C		Bill George	6 ft 7 in (2.01 m)	—	Jr
G		Phil Mathews	6 ft 0 in (1.83 m)	—	Jr	Riverside, California
F		Bill Moore	6 ft 6 in (1.98 m)	—	Jr
F		Phil Rhyne	6 ft 5 in (1.96 m)	—	Jr
G		Troy Rolph	6 ft 0 in (1.83 m)	—	Jr

Head coach

Tim Tift (Pepperdine)

Assistant coach(es)

Legend

- (C) Team captain
- (S) Suspended
- (I) Ineligible
- (W) Walk-on
- Injured
- Current redshirt

Roster

== Schedule ==
Date time, TV	Rank^{#}	Opponent^{#}	Result	Record	Site city, state
Regular Season
December 1, 1970*		Sonoma State	W 95–55	1–0	Crawford Hall; Irvine, CA
December 4, 1970*		at Cal State LA	L 66–78	1–1	Los Angeles, CA
December 10, 1970*		vs. Whittier; Kris Kringle Klassic	W 68–59	2–1	Titan Gym; Fullerton, CA
December 11, 1970*		at Cal State Fullerton; Kris Kringle Klassic	W 68–50	3–1	Titan Gym; Fullerton, CA
December 19, 1970*		Stanislaus State	W 85–59	4–1	Crawford Hall; Irvine, CA
December 21, 1970*		Humboldt State	W 94–74	5–1	Crawford Hall; Irvine, CA
December 28, 1970*		Chapman; UCI Invitational	W 97–76	6–1	Crawford Hall; Irvine, CA
December 29, 1970*		Cal Poly Pomona; UCI Invitational	W 92–75	7–1	Crawford Hall; Irvine, CA
December 30, 1970*		Cal State Fullerton; UCI Invitational	L 69–70	7–2	Crawford Hall; Irvine, CA
January 6, 1971*		Colorado	L 65–68	7–3	Crawford Hall; Irvine, CA
January 9, 1971*		Cal State Fullerton	L 82–84	7–4	Crawford Hall; Irvine, CA
January 12, 1971*		at UC San Diego	W 80–77	8–4	San Diego, CA
January 16, 1971*		at San Fernando Valley State	L 78–93	8–5	Matadome; Northridge, CA
January 19, 1971*		Chapman	W 88–80	9–5	Crawford Hall; Irvine, CA
January 22, 1971*		UC Riverside; All-UC Invitational Tournament	L 66–71	9–6	San Diego, CA
January 23, 1971*		UC Davis; All-UC Invitational Tournament	W 72–69	10–6	San Diego, CA
January 26, 1971*		at Occidental	W 82–75	11–6	Los Angeles, CA
January 28, 1971*		at LSU New Orleans	L 79–104	11–7	New Orleans, LA
January 30, 1971*		at Florida State	L 69–83	11–8	Tully Gymnasium; Tallahassee, FL
February 2, 1971*		San Fernando Valley State	L 68–69	11–9	Crawford Hall; Irvine, CA
February 6, 1971*		San Diego State	L 67–71	11–10	Crawford Hall; Irvine, CA
February 10, 1971*		at Cal State Fullerton	W 77–71	12–10	Titan Gym; Fullerton, CA
February 20, 1971*		Cal Poly Pomona	W 84–72	13–10	Crawford Hall; Irvine, CA
February 26, 1971*		at Chapman	W 80–79	14–10	Orange, CA
February 27, 1971*		Cal Poly	W 75–71	15–10	Crawford Hall; Irvine, CA
March 6, 1971*		at UC Riverside	W 96–92	16–10	UC Riverside Gymnasium; Riverside, CA
*Non-conference game. ^{#}Rankings from AP Poll. (#) Tournament seedings in parentheses. All times are in Pacific Time.
