= 1967–68 UC Irvine Anteaters men's basketball team =

American college basketball season

1967–68 UC Irvine Anteaters men's basketball

NCAA College Division Tournament, Pacific Coast Regional Final
- Conference: Independent
- Record: 20–8
- Head coach: Dick Davis (1st season)
- Home arena: Campus Hall

The 1967–68 UC Irvine Anteaters men's basketball team represented the University of California, Irvine during the 1967–68 NCAA College Division men's basketball season. The Anteaters were led by first year head coach Dick Davis and played their home games at Campus Hall. They were invited to the 1968 NCAA College Division basketball tournament where they lost to the Nevada Southern Rebels in the regional finals. The anteaters finished the season with a record of 20–8.

== Previous season ==
The 1966–67 Anteaters finished with a record of 15–11 under second year coach Danny Rogers. Danny Rogers resigned at the end of the season and frosh coach Dick Davis was promoted to the position of head coach.

== Roster ==
1967–68 UC Irvine Anteaters men's basketball team
Players
Coaches

Pos.	#	Name	Height	Weight	Year	Hometown
G		Charlie Brande	—	—
G		Doug Christie	—	—
G		Bill Coon	—	—
F		Jeff Cunningham	—	—
F		Dave Fontius	—	—
G		Alan Gladstone	—	—
C		Mike Hechman	—	—
G		Jim Jarley	—	—
G		Darrell Millner	—	—
C		Steve Parker	—	—
F		Bill Roley	—	—
F		Nick Sanden	—	—

Head coach

Dick Davis

Assistant coach(es)

Legend

- (C) Team captain
- (S) Suspended
- (I) Ineligible
- (W) Walk-on
- Injured
- Current redshirt

Roster

== Schedule ==
Date time, TV	Rank^{#}	Opponent^{#}	Result	Record	Site city, state
Regular season
December 1, 1967*		Long Beach State	W 77–69	1–0	Campus Hall; Irvine, CA
December 2, 1967*		at Redlands	W 80–78	2–0	Currier Gym; Redlands, CA
December 9, 1967*		San Fernando Valley State	L 93–97	2–1	Campus Hall; Irvine, CA
December 15, 1967*		vs. Westminster College; Pomona College Tournament	L 72–75	2–2	Pomona, CA
December 16, 1967*		Cal Western; Pomona College Tournament	W 105–90	3–2	Pomona, CA
December 22, 1967*		Cascade College	W 96–72	4–2	Campus Hall; Irvine, CA
December 27, 1967*		Occidental; UCI Invitational	W 82–77	5–2	Campus Hall; Irvine, CA
December 28, 1967*		San Diego; UCI Invitational	W 81–72	6–2	Campus Hall; Irvine, CA
December 29, 1967*		Cal State LA; UCI Invitational	L 85–98	6–3	Campus Hall; Irvine, CA
January 2, 1968*		Rhode Island	W 98–84	7–3	Campus Hall; Irvine, CA
January 8, 1968*		at Westmont	W 77–76	8–3	Montecito, CA
January 13, 1968*		San Diego	W 67–61	9–3	Campus Hall; Irvine, CA
January 16, 1968*		at UC Riverside	W 79–71	10–3	UC Riverside Gymnasium; Riverside, CA
January 19, 1968*		at Cal State LA	W 84–82	11–3	Los Angeles, CA
January 24, 1968*		Westmont	W 90–87	12–3	Campus Hall; Irvine, CA
January 27, 1968*		at Chapman	W 71–63	13–3	Orange, CA
January 30, 1968*		at San Fernando Valley State	W 86–80	14–3	Matadome; Northridge, CA
February 3, 1968*		at Nevada Southern	L 84–98	14–4	NSU Gym; Paradise, NV
February 9, 1968*		Chapman	W 88–62	15–4	Campus Hall; Irvine, CA
February 10, 1968*		at San Diego	L 73–75	15–5	San Diego, CA
February 16, 1968*		UC Riverside	W 95–85	16–5	Campus Hall; Irvine, CA
February 17, 1968*		Nevada Southern	W 82–81 ^{OT}	17–5	Campus Hall; Irvine, CA
February 19, 1968*		Fresno State	L 71–77	17–6	Campus Hall; Irvine, CA
February 22, 1968*		at UC Santa Barbara	L 78–83	17–7	Robertson Gymnasium; Santa Barbara, CA
February 24, 1968*		at Cal Lutheran	W 92–70	18–7	Thousand Oaks, CA
March 1, 1968*		at Cal State Fullerton	W 80–70	19–7	Titan Gym; Fullerton, CA
NCAA Tournament
March 7, 1968*		at San Diego State; Regional semifinal	W 78–69	20–7	Peterson Gym; San Diego, CA
March 8, 1968*		vs. Nevada Southern; Regional Final	L 74–79	20–8	Peterson Gym; San Diego, CA
*Non-conference game. ^{#}Rankings from AP Poll. (#) Tournament seedings in parentheses. All times are in Pacific Time.
