= 1965–66 UC Irvine Anteaters men's basketball team =

American college basketball season

1965–66 UC Irvine Anteaters men's basketball
- Conference: Independent
- Record: 15–11
- Head coach: Danny Rogers (1st season)
- Home arena: Campus Hall

The 1965–66 UC Irvine Anteaters men's basketball team represented the University of California, Irvine during the 1965–66 NCAA College Division men's basketball season. This was the program's first season competing in intercollegiate athletics. The Anteaters were led by first year head coach Danny Rogers and played their home games at Campus Hall. They finished their inaugural season 15–11.

== Roster ==
1965–66 UC Irvine Anteaters men's basketball team
Players
Coaches

Pos.	#	Name	Height	Weight	Year	Hometown
		Skip Allan	—	—
F		Jeff Bland	—	—
		Bill Brockman	—	—
G		Tom Bryan	—	—		Orange Coast College
		John Driscoll	—	—
F		Dale Finney	6 ft 4 in (1.93 m)	—		Santa Ana College
G		Bob Johnson	—	—		Cerritos College
		Bob Lund	—	—
F		Eldon McBride	6 ft 4 in (1.93 m)	—		Antelope Valley College
G		Scott McOwen	—	—
C		Mark Nelson	6 ft 6 in (1.98 m)	230 lb (104 kg)		Glendale College
G		Jim Splittgerber	—	—

Head coach

Danny Rogers

Assistant coach(es)

Legend

- (C) Team captain
- (S) Suspended
- (I) Ineligible
- (W) Walk-on
- Injured
- Current redshirt

Roster

== Schedule ==
Date time, TV	Rank^{#}	Opponent^{#}	Result	Record	Site (attendance) city, state
Regular Season
December 1, 1965*		UC Riverside	W 85–71	1–0	Campus Hall; Irvine, CA
December 3, 1965*		Cal Poly	W 81–72	2–0	Campus Hall; Irvine, CA
December 4, 1965*		Pomona	L 77–87	2–1	Campus Hall; Irvine, CA
December 10, 1965*		PHIBPAC	W 87–74	3–1	Campus Hall; Irvine, CA
December 20, 1965*		vs. Long Beach State; Kris Kringle Klassic	L 84–92	3–2	Titan Gym; Fullerton, CA
December 21, 1965*		vs. Redlands; Kris Kringle Klassic	W 67–65	4–2	Titan Gym; Fullerton, CA
December 22, 1965*		vs. UC Riverside; Kris Kringle Klassic	L 76–88	4–3	Titan Gym; Fullerton, CA
December 29, 1965*		vs. UC Riverside; UC Davis Tournament	W 65–61	5–3	Hickey Gymnasium; Davis, CA
December 30, 1965*		at UC Davis; UC Davis Tournament	L 61–66	5–4	Hickey Gymnasium; Davis, CA
January 5, 1966*		at Caltech	W 100–57	6–4	Braun Gymnasium; Pasadena, CA
January 7, 1966*		at Cal Lutheran	W 85–71	7–4	Thousands Oaks, CA
January 8, 1966*		at Westmont	L 70–78	7–5	Montecito, CA
January 14, 1966*		at Chapman	L 53–58	7–6	Orange, CA
January 15, 1966*		Cal State Fullerton	W 74–68	8–6	Campus Hall; Irvine, CA
January 21, 1966*		at San Diego	L 52–73	8–7	San Diego, CA
January 22, 1966*		at Cal Western	L 67–82	8–8	San Diego, CA
January 28, 1966*		Fresno Pacific; UCI Invitational	W 85–70	9–8	Campus Hall; Irvine, CA
January 29, 1966*		Chapman; UCI Invitational	L 71–73	9–9	Campus Hall; Irvine, CA
February 2, 1966*		La Verne	W 100–75	10–9	Campus Hall; Irvine, CA
February 5, 1966*		Cal Baptist	W 109–75	11–9	Campus Hall; Irvine, CA
February 12, 1966*		Westmont	W 100–87	12–9	Campus Hall; Irvine, CA
February 15, 1966*		Biola	W 91–54	13–9	Campus Hall; Irvine, CA
February 18, 1966*		at UC Riverside	W 80–69	14–9	UC Riverside Gymnasium; Riverside, CA
February 19, 1966*		Caltech	W 105–66	15–9	Campus Hall; Irvine, CA
February 25, 1966*		Chapman	L 76–80	15–10	Campus Hall; Irvine, CA
February 26, 1966*		at Cal State Fullerton	L 83–85	15–11	Titan Gym; Fullerton, CA
*Non-conference game. ^{#}Rankings from AP Poll. (#) Tournament seedings in parentheses. All times are in Pacific Time.
