= Bren Events Center =

Arena in California, United States

- The Bren
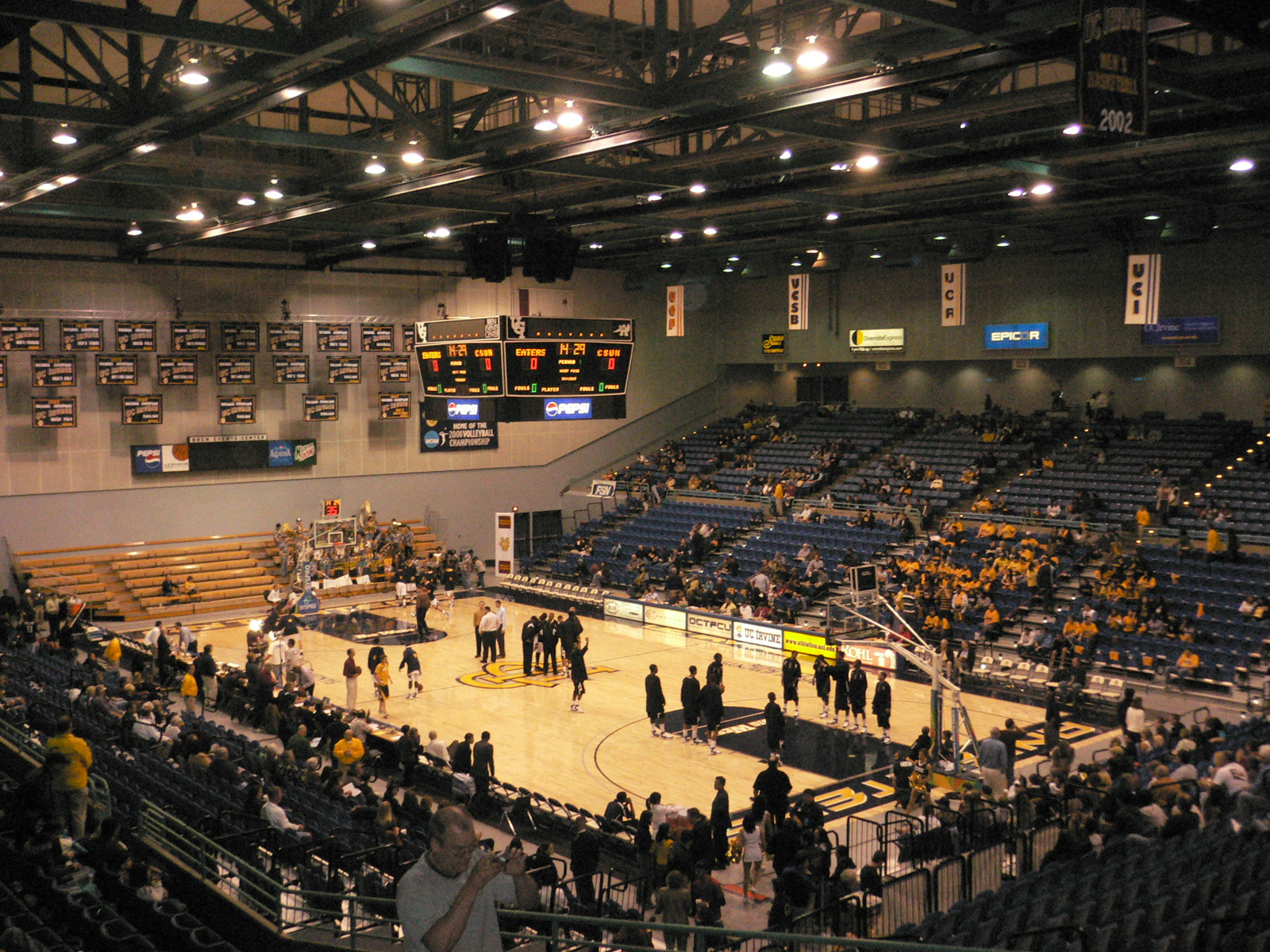
- Interactive map of Bren Events Center
- Full name: Donald Bren Events Center
- Location: 100 Bren Event Center Drive; Irvine, CA 92612
- Coordinates: 33°38′57″N 117°50′49″W
- Owner: University of California, Irvine
- Operator: University of California, Irvine
- Capacity: 5,000 (for basketball); 5,430 (for concerts); 5,608 (maximum)
- Surface: Hardwood

Construction
- Groundbreaking: 1984
- Opened: January 8, 1987
- Cost: $14 million ($39.7 million in 2025 dollars)
- Architect: Parkin Architects Limited

Tenants
- UC Irvine Anteaters men's basketball UC Irvine Anteaters women's basketball UC Irvine Anteaters men's volleyball UC Irvine Anteaters women's volleyball

The Donald Bren Events Center, commonly known as the Bren Events Center or simply the Bren, is a 5,608-seat indoor arena on the campus of the University of California, Irvine, in Irvine, California, United States.

== Construction and history ==
It was conceived and planned in 1981, with the passage of a student referendum authorizing an assessment of $23 per student per quarter as of winter 1987. It opened January 8, 1987, with UCI men's basketball vs. Utah State. Parkin Architects Limited served as the architects for the building, which was renamed "Donald Bren Events Center" in 1988. The University of California, Irvine renamed the structure in honor of real estate mogul and chairman of the Irvine Company, Donald Bren, upon receipt of a $1.5 million donation.

In fall 2023, renovations began on the Bren Events Center to install a new jumbotron on the south wall as well as new ribbon boards around the perimeter of the arena. A temporary court was also installed due to damage from a flood.

=== Amenities ===
It is a 65,000 assignable (90,000 gross) square-foot multi-purpose facility servicing the university and all of southern California. It features a 22,000-square-foot (2,000 m^{2}) arena which hosts UCI Anteater Basketball, volleyball and serves as a general assembly space for special events. Additional conference and meeting spaces are available to support arena events and to host small meetings. In addition, it provides:

- An arena of approximately 21,300 ASF that accommodates intercollegiate regulation basketball.
- An arena that can be converted into three courts for recreational use for basketball and volleyball.
- An arena with seating of 5,000 for spectator sporting events and 5,710 for concerts, lectures and conventions .
- The Koll Room, a multi-purpose room of 1,820 ASF on the arena level to accommodate meetings, receptions, and instruction.
- The Stewart Room, a room of 1,600 ASF suitable for receptions for 150 and banquet seating for 60.
- The Berry Family Terrace, an outdoor terrace of 4,480 ASF suitable for intermission and pre- or post event receptions.

== Tenants ==
=== Athletics ===
It serves as the home to UC Irvine Anteaters athletic programs. Men's basketball, women's basketball, and men's volleyball all play their home games at Bren.

The facility was home to the 1990, 1991 and 1992 U.S. Open Badminton Championships.

=== Other events ===
It is also used for concerts, trade fairs, conventions, Broadway shows and graduation ceremonies.

Recent examples of usage include hosting Tenzin Gyatso, the 14th Dalai Lama, when he spoke in 2004, while Jimmy Carter spoke and answered questions about his book Palestine: Peace Not Apartheid on 3 May 2007. Bill Clinton spoke at a campaign rally for local Democratic candidates in 2012.

The university's Filipino cultural organization, Kababayan, hosts their annual Pilipinx American Cultural Night, abbreviated to PACN, at the Bren. It is the largest Filipino cultural performance in the state.

TNA Wrestling also held its 2009 Bound For Glory Event here.

Blink-182 headlined a sold-out show at the Bren in 1999.

== See also ==
- List of convention centers in the United States
- List of NCAA Division I basketball arenas
- Crawford Hall
