= Sacred Heart Pioneers men's basketball =

College basketball team

Sacred Heart Pioneers
2025–26 Sacred Heart Pioneers men's basketball team
- University: Sacred Heart University
- Head coach: Anthony Latina (13th season)
- Location: Fairfield, Connecticut
- Arena: William H. Pitt Center (capacity: 2,062)
- Conference: Metro Conference
- Nickname: Pioneers
- Colors: Red and white

NCAA Division I tournament champions
- 1986*
Other NCAA Division I tournament results
Final Four	1977*, 1986*
Elite Eight	1977*, 1978*, 1982*, 1983*, 1984*, 1986*, 1989*
Sweet Sixteen	1977*, 1978*, 1981*, 1982*, 1983*, 1984*, 1985*, 1986*, 1987*, 1989*
Appearances	1971*, 1972*, 1975*, 1977*, 1978*, 1981*, 1982*, 1983*, 1984*, 1985*, 1986*, 1987*, 1989*
- * at Division II level

The Sacred Heart Pioneers men's basketball team represents Sacred Heart University in Fairfield, Connecticut, United States. The school's team currently competes in the Metro Conference. They play their home games at the William H. Pitt Center. During their time as members of the NCAA Division II, they were national champions in 1986. Since joining NCAA Division I for the 1999-2000 season, the Pioneers have never appeared in the NCAA Division I men's basketball tournament.

== History ==
In 1983, Keith Bennett became the school's leading career scorer. He was named a National Association of Basketball Coaches Division II All-American in 1981, 1982, and 1983, and Regional Player of the Year in 1982 and 1983.

2014–15 was the 50th season of Pioneer basketball. Sacred Heart's first year of competition was the 1965–66 season under coach Don Feeley. Sacred Heart joined NCAA Division I in the 1999–2000 season.

=== Classification ===
Years	Classification	National Tournaments	Seasons
1999–2000 to Present	NCAA Division I	0 appearances	27
1965–66 to 1998–99	NCAA Division II	13 appearances	34

=== Home court ===
Years	Venue	Seasons
1997–98 to Present	William H. Pitt Center	29
1965–66 to 1996–97	Memorial Hall	32

=== Conference affiliation ===
Years	Conference	Seasons
2024–25 to Present	Metro Conference (Note: Formerly known as the Metro Atlantic Athletic Conference until 2026.)	2
1999–2000 to 2023–24	Northeast Conference (Note: Currently known as its acronym (the NEC) since 2025.)	25
1981–82 to 1996–97	New England Collegiate Conference	16
1965–66 to 1980–81; 1997–98 to 1998–99	Division II Independent	18

== Postseason ==
=== NCAA Division II Tournament results ===
The Pioneers have appeared in 13 NCAA Division II Tournaments. Their combined record is 22–15. They were national champions in 1986.

Year	Round	Opponent	Result
1971	Regional semifinals Regional 3rd-place game	Assumption; Stonehill	L 83–106; W 86–81
1972	Regional semifinals Regional 3rd Place	Assumption; Bridgeport	L 82–112; L 89–107
1975	Regional semifinals Regional 3rd Place	Assumption; Hartford	L 95–111; L 91–102
1977	Regional semifinals Regional Finals; Elite Eight; Final Four; National 3rd-place game	Assumption; Merrimack; Towson State; Chattanooga; North Alabama	W 83–78; W 110–104; W 85–82; L 81–95; L 77–93
1978	Regional semifinals Regional Finals; Elite Eight	Bridgeport; Merrimack; Cheyney	W 73–70; W 84–83 ^{OT} L 57–59
1981	Regional semifinals Regional Finals	Stonehill; Southern New Hampshire	W 89–86; L 80–81
1982	Regional semifinals Regional Finals; Elite Eight	Springfield; Southern Connecticut; Kentucky Wesleyan	W 66–61; W 78–67; L 85–88
1983	Regional semifinals Regional Finals; Elite Eight	Assumption; American International; District of Columbia	W 113–108 ^{4OT} W 72–68; L 38–45
1984	Regional semifinals Regional Finals; Elite Eight	American International; South Dakota State; Saint Augustine's	W 72–69 ^{2OT} W 88–81 ^{OT} L 92–107
1985	Regional semifinals Regional Finals	Bridgeport; American International	W 47–45; L 74–80
1986	Regional semifinals Regional Finals; Elite Eight; Final Four; National Championship Game	Springfield; Southern New Hampshire; Norfolk State; Florida Southern; Southeast Missouri State	W 76–74 ^{2OT} W 83–67; W 84–74; W 86–80; W 93–87
1987	Regional semifinals Regional Finals	Saint Anselm; Southern New Hampshire	W 82–80; L 67–73
1989	Regional semifinals Regional Finals; Elite Eight	Bentley; Bridgeport; North Carolina Central	W 103–88; W 69–67; L 57–58
