= Gary Stewart (basketball) =

American basketball player and coach

Current position
- Title: Head coach
- Team: Stevenson
- Conference: MAC

Biographical details
- Born: July 24, 1961 (age 65); Los Angeles, California, U.S.

Playing career
- 1980–1984: La Verne

Coaching career (HC unless noted)
- 1984–1986: Long Beach State (assistant)
- 1987–1995: La Verne
- 1995–1997: Cal State East Bay
- 1997–1998: UC Santa Barbara (assistant)
- 1999–2002: Washington State (assistant)
- 2002–2003: UCLA (operations)
- 2003–2011: UC Davis
- 2011–2025: Stevenson
- 2025-present: UC Merced

Gary L. Stewart (born July 24, 1961) is an American college basketball coach and the former head men's basketball coach at the University of California, Davis. In 2011, Stewart stepped down at UC Davis and became special projects administrator in the athletic department. Later that year, Stewart was named men's head coach at Stevenson University. He led the Mustangs in his second season to the playoffs for the first time in 7 years.

Stewart has also coached at Long Beach State, La Verne, California State University, East Bay, UC Santa Barbara, and Washington State. In 1997, he was named NCAC Co-Coach of the Year, and Bay Area Men's College Coach of the Year.
