= 1975 NCAA Division II basketball tournament =

Edition of USA college basketball tournament

- Teams: 32
- Finals site: , Evansville, Indiana
- Champions: Old Dominion Monarchs (1st title)
- Runner-up: New Orleans Privateers (1st title game)
- Semifinalists: Assumption Greyhounds (3rd Final Four); Tennessee State Tigers (4th Final Four)
- Winning coach: Sonny Allen (1st title)
- MOP: Wilson Washington (Old Dominion)
- Attendance: 12,909

The 1975 NCAA Division II basketball tournament involved 32 schools playing in a single-elimination tournament to determine the national champion of men's NCAA Division II college basketball as a culmination of the 1974–75 NCAA Division II men's basketball season. It was won by Old Dominion University and Old Dominion's Wilson Washington was the Most Outstanding Player.

1975 NCAA Division II Men's sites - regionals (cyan) Elite Eight (red)

== Regional participants ==
School	Outcome
Assumption	Regional Champion
Bentley	Runner-up
Hartford	Third Place
Sacred Heart	Fourth Place

School	Outcome
C. W. Post	Runner-up
Gannon	Regional Champion
Hartwick	Fourth Place
Philadelphia U	Third Place

School	Outcome
Lincoln (MO)	Runner-up
New Orleans	Regional Champion
Southern	Third Place
West Georgia	Fourth Place

School	Outcome
Puget Sound	Runner-up
UC Davis	Third Place
UC Irvine	Fourth Place
UC Riverside	Regional Champion

School	Outcome
Augustana (SD)	Third Place
Missouri-Rolla	Fourth Place
Nebraska-Omaha	Runner-up
North Dakota	Regional Champion

School	Outcome
Baltimore	Third Place
Morgan State	Fourth Place
Old Dominion	Regional Champion
Randolph-Macon	Runner-up

School	Outcome
Alabama State	Fourth Place
Armstrong Atlantic	Third Place
Chattanooga	Runner-up
Tennessee State	Regional Champion

School	Outcome
Akron	Regional Champion
Eastern Illinois	Third Place
St. Joseph's (IN)	Runner-up
Youngstown State	Fourth Place

*denotes tie

== Regionals ==
=== New England - Waltham, Massachusetts ===
Location: Dana Center Host: Bentley College

Regional semifinals Round of 32; March 7
Assumption	111
Sacred Heart	95
Bentley	99
Hartford	82

Regional Final; Sweet 16; March 8
Assumption	87
Bentley	82

- Third Place - Hartford 102, Sacred Heart 91

=== East - Erie, Pennsylvania ===
Location: Hammermill Center Host: Gannon University

Regional semifinals Round of 32; March 7
C. W. Post	72
Philadelphia U	68
Gannon	65*
Hartwick	64

Regional Final; Sweet 16; March 8
C. W. Post	60
Gannon	67

- Third Place - Philadelphia U 80, Hartwick 75

=== South Central - New Orleans, Louisiana ===
Location: Human Performance Center Host: University of New Orleans

Regional semifinals Round of 32; March 7
New Orleans	90
West Georgia	89
Lincoln (MO)	93
Southern	87

Regional Final; Sweet 16; March 8
New Orleans	84
Lincoln	83

- Third Place - Southern 103, West Georgia 98

=== West - Irvine, California ===
Location: Crawford Hall Host: University of California, Irvine

Regional semifinals Round of 32; March 7
UC Riverside	78
UC Davis	77
Puget Sound	76*
UC Irvine	74

Regional Final; Sweet 16; March 8
UC Riverside	59
Puget Sound	58

- Third Place - UC Davis 84, UC Irvine 70

=== North Central - Grand Forks, North Dakota ===
Location: Hyslop Sports Center Host: University of North Dakota

Regional semifinals Round of 32; March 7
North Dakota	72
Missouri-Rolla	61
Nebraska-Omaha	69
Augustana (SD)	61

Regional Final; Sweet 16; March 8
North Dakota	84
Nebraska-Omaha	71

- Third Place - Augustana 71, Missouri-Rolla 64

=== South Atlantic - Norfolk, Virginia ===
Location: Norfolk Scope Host: Old Dominion University

Regional semifinals Round of 32; March 7
Old Dominion	95
Baltimore	72
Randolph-Macon	64
Morgan State	60

Regional Final; Sweet 16; March 8
Old Dominion	83
Randolph-Macon	76

- Third Place - Baltimore 77, Morgan State 76

=== South - Chattanooga, Tennessee ===
Location: Maclellan Gymnasium Host: University of Tennessee at Chattanooga

Regional semifinals Round of 32; March 7
Chattanooga	107
Alabama State	83
Tennessee State	63
Armstrong Atlantic	53

Regional Final; Sweet 16; March 8
Chattanooga	81
Tennessee State	82

- Third Place - Armstrong Atlantic 110, Alabama State 78

=== Great Lakes - Charleston, Illinois ===
Location: Lantz Arena Host: Eastern Illinois University

Regional semifinals Round of 32; March 7
St. Joseph's (IN)	96
Youngstown State	78
Akron	76
Eastern Illinois	62

Regional Final; Sweet 16; March 8
St. Joseph's	52
Akron	58

- Third Place - Eastern Illinois 86, Youngstown State 80

*denotes each overtime played

== National Finals - Evansville, Indiana ==
Location: Roberts Municipal Stadium Host: University of Evansville

National Quarterfinals; Elite Eight; March 12
Assumption	81
Gannon	69
New Orleans	73
UC Riverside	59
North Dakota	62
Old Dominion	78
Tennessee State	72
Akron	69

National semifinals Final Four; March 13
Assumption	73
New Orleans	84*
Old Dominion	77
Tennessee State	60

National Championship; March 14
New Orleans	74
Old Dominion	76

- Third Place - Assumption 88, Tennessee State 80

*denotes each overtime played

== All-tournament team ==
- Paul Brennan (Assumption)
- Joey Caruthers (Old Dominion)
- John Grochowalski (Assumption)
- Wilbur Holland (New Orleans)
- Wilson Washington (Old Dominion)

== See also ==
- 1975 NCAA Division I basketball tournament
- 1975 NCAA Division III basketball tournament
- 1975 NAIA Basketball Tournament

== Sources ==
- 2010 NCAA Men's Basketball Championship Tournament Records and Statistics: Division II men's basketball Championship
- 1975 NCAA Division II men's basketball tournament jonfmorse.com
