= LSU New Orleans Privateers men's basketball =

LSU New Orleans Privateers
2026–27 LSU New Orleans Privateers men's basketball team
- University: LSU New Orleans
- Head coach: Stacy Hollowell (3rd season)
- Location: New Orleans, Louisiana
- Arena: Lakefront Arena (capacity: 8,933)
- Conference: Southland
- Nickname: Privateers
- Colors: Privateers Purple, Privateers Gold, and Privateers Silver Gray

NCAA Division I tournament appearances
- 1987, 1991, 1993, 1996, 2017

NCAA Division II tournament runner-up
- 1975
Other NCAA Division II tournament results
Final Four	1974, 1975
Elite Eight	1974, 1975
Sweet Sixteen	1974, 1975
Appearances	1971, 1972, 1974, 1975

Conference tournament champions
- American South: 1990; Sun Belt: 1978, 1996; Southland: 2017

Conference regular-season champions
- American South: 1988, 1989, 1990, 1991; Sun Belt: 1993, 1996, 1997; Southland: 2017
- * at Division II level

The LSU New Orleans Privateers men's basketball team represents LSU New Orleans in New Orleans, Louisiana, United States. The school's team currently competes as a member of the Southland Conference. They are currently led by head coach Stacy Hollowell and play their home games at Lakefront Arena. The Privateers have appeared five times in the NCAA Division I men's basketball tournament, most recently in 2017.

Of the 13 head coaches in the history of LSUNO basketball, four of them are native Hoosiers: Ron Greene (1969–1976), Don Smith (1979–1985), Monte Towe (2001-2006) and Mark Slessinger (2011–2024)

== Conference affiliations ==
- 1969–70 to 1975–76 – NCAA Division II Independent
- 1976–77 to 1979–80 – Sun Belt Conference
- 1980–81 to 1986–87 – NCAA Division I Independent
- 1987–88 to 1990–91 – American South Conference
- 1991–92 to 2009–10 – Sun Belt Conference
- 2010–11 to 2012–13 – NCAA Division I Independent
- 2013–14 to Present – Southland Conference

== Season-by-season results ==
Record table
Season	Team	Overall	Conference	Standing	Postseason
Ron Greene (D–II Independent/Sun Belt) (1969–1976)
1969–70	New Orleans	18–5			
1970–71	New Orleans	23–3			D–II Regional semifinals
1971–72	New Orleans	16–10			D–II Regional semifinals
1972–73	New Orleans	9–13			
1973–74	New Orleans	21–9			D–II Final Four
1974–75	New Orleans	23–7			D–II Runner-Up
1975–76	New Orleans	18–8			
1976–77	New Orleans	18–10	4–2	2nd	
Ron Greene:		146–65 (.692)	4–2 (.667)		
Butch van Breda Kolff (Sun Belt) (1977–1978)
1977–78	New Orleans	21–6	8–2	2nd	
1978–79	New Orleans	11–16	3–7	5th	
Butch van Breda Kolff:		32–22 (.593)	11–9 (.550)		
Don Smith (Sun Belt/Independent) (1979–1984)
1979–80	New Orleans	5–21	2–12	7th	
1980–81	New Orleans	13–14			
1981–82	New Orleans	18–8			
1982–83	New Orleans	23–7			NIT second round
1983–84	New Orleans	14–14			
1984–85	New Orleans	11–19			
Don Smith:		84–83 (.503)	2–12 (.143)		
Benny Dees (Independent) (1985–1986)
1985–86	New Orleans	16–12			
1986–87	New Orleans	26–4			NCAA second round
Benny Dees:		42–16 (.724)			
Art Tolis (American South) (1987)
1987–88	New Orleans	21–11	7–3	T–1st	NIT first round
Art Tolis:		21–11 (.656)	7–3 (.700)		
Tim Floyd (American South/Sun Belt) (1988–1993)
1988–89	New Orleans	19–11	7–3	1st	NIT first round
1989–90	New Orleans	21–11	8–2	T–1st	NIT Quarterfinals
1990–91	New Orleans	23–8	9–3	T–1st	NCAA first round
1991–92	New Orleans	17–15	8–8	7th	
1992–93	New Orleans	26–4	18–0	1stma	NCAA first round
1993–94	New Orleans	20–10	12–6	3rd	NIT second round
Tim Floyd:		126–59 (.681)	62–22 (.738)		
Tic Price (Sun Belt) (1994–1996)
1994–95	New Orleans	20–11	13–5	2nd	
1995–96	New Orleans	21–9	14–4	T–1st	NCAA first round
1996–97	New Orleans	22–7	14–4	T–1st	NIT first round
Tic Price:		63–27 (.700)	41–13 (.759)		
Joey Stiebing (Sun Belt) (1997–2000)
1997–98	New Orleans	15–12	9–9	T–5th	
1998–99	New Orleans	14–16	5–9	T–7th	
1999–00	New Orleans	11–18	6–10	7th	
2000–01	New Orleans	17–12	10–6	T–2nd (West)	
Joey Stiebing:		57–58 (.496)	30–34 (.469)		
Monte Towe (Sun Belt) (2001–2005)
2001–02	New Orleans	15–14	9–6	3rd (West)	
2002–03	New Orleans	15–14	7–8	T–3rd (West)	
2003–04	New Orleans	17–14	9–6	2nd (West)	
2004–05	New Orleans	13–17	7–8	3rd (West)	
2005–06	New Orleans	10–19	6–9	T–4th (West)	
Monte Towe:		70–78 (.473)	38–37 (.507)		
Buzz Williams (Sun Belt) (2006)
2006–07	New Orleans	14–17	9–9	4th (West)	
Buzz Williams:		14–17 (.452)	9–9 (.500)		
Joe Pasternack (Sun Belt/Independent) (2007–2010)
2007–08	New Orleans	19–13	8–10	4th (West)	
2008–09	New Orleans	11–19	6–12	T–5th (West)	
2009–10	New Orleans	8–22	3–15	7th (West)	
2010–11	New Orleans	16–6			
Joe Pasternack:		54–60 (.474)	17–37 (.315)		
Mark Slessinger (Independent/Southland) (2011–2024)
2011–12	New Orleans	17–15			
2012–13	New Orleans	8–18			
2013–14	New Orleans	11–15	8–10	8th	
2014–15	New Orleans	11–18	6–12	T–10th	
2015–16	New Orleans	10–20	6–12	T–9th	
2016–17	New Orleans	20–12	13–5	1st	NCAA First Four
2017–18	New Orleans	16–17	11–7	T–5th	CBI Quarterfinals
2018–19	New Orleans	19–14	12–6	T–3rd	CIT first round
2019–20	New Orleans	9–21	5–15	T–11th	
2020–21	New Orleans	10–15	8–7	6th	
2021–22	New Orleans	18–14	10–4	T–2nd	TBC first round
2022–23	New Orleans	12–20	7–11	T–6th	
2023–24	New Orleans	10–23	4–14	T–8th	
Mark Slessinger:		171–222 (.435)	90–103 (.466)		
Stacy Hollowell (Southland) (2025–Present)
2024–25	New Orleans	4–27	2–18	12th	
2025–26	New Orleans	15–18	12–10	T–5th	
2026–27	LSU New Orleans	0–0	0–0		
Stacy Hollowell:		19–45 (.297)	14–28 (.333)		
Total:		890–742 (.545)			
National champion Postseason invitational champion Conference regular season champion Conference regular season and conference tournament champion Division regular season champion Division regular season and conference tournament champion Conference tournament champion

== Postseason appearances ==
=== NCAA Division I tournament results ===
The Privateers have appeared in the NCAA Division I tournament five times. Their combined record is 1–5.

Year	Seed	Round	Opponent	Result
1987	7	First round Second Round	(10) BYU (2) Alabama	W 83–79; L 76–101
1991	14	First round	(3) Kansas	L 49–55
1993	8	First round	(9) Xavier	L 55–73
1996	11	First round	(6) North Carolina	L 62–83
2017	16	First Four	(16) Mount St. Mary's	L 66–67

=== National Invitational Tournament (NIT) results ===
The Privateers have appeared in the National Invitation Tournament (NIT) six times. Their combined record is 4–6.

Year	Round	Opponent	Result
1983	First round Second Round	LSU; Oregon State	W 99–94; L 71–88
1988	First round	Colorado State	L 54–63
1989	First round	Wisconsin	L 61–63
1990	First round Second Round; Quarterfinals	James Madison; Mississippi State; Vanderbilt	W 78–74; W 65–60; L 65–88
1994	First round Second Round	Texas A&M; Vanderbilt	W 79–73; L 59–78
1997	First round	Pittsburgh	L 63–82

=== College Basketball Invitational (CBI) results ===
The Privateers have appeared in the College Basketball Invitational (CBI) once. Their combined record is 1–1.

Year	Round	Opponent	Result
2018	First round Quarterfinals	Texas–Rio Grande Valley; Campbell	W 77–74; L 69–71

=== CollegeInsider.com Tournament (CIT) results ===
The Privateers have appeared in the CollegeInsider.com Tournament (CIT) once. Their combined record is 0–1.

Year	Round	Opponent	Result
2019	First round	Texas Southern	L 89–95 ^{OT}

=== The Basketball Classic results ===
The Privateers have appeared in The Basketball Classic one time. Their record is 0–1.

Year	Round	Opponent	Result
2022	First round	Portland	L 73-94

=== NCAA Division II tournament results ===
The Privateers, then known as Louisiana State University in New Orleans, appeared in the NCAA Division II Tournament four times. Their combined record was 9–6.

Year	Round	Opponent	Result
1971	Regional Semifinals; Regional 3rd-place game	Southwestern Louisiana; Louisiana Tech	L 107–113; L 88–107
1972	Regional Quarterfinals; Regional Semifinals; Regional 3rd Place Game	Prairie View A&M; Wartburg; Transylvania	W 80–72; L 79–80; W 110–74
1974	Regional Semifinals; Regional Finals; Elite Eight; Final Four; National 3rd Place Game	Southern; Fisk; UC Riverside; Southwest Missouri State; Assumption	W 85–80; W 78–63; W 83–78; L 63–68; L 103–115
1975	Regional Semifinals; Regional Finals; Elite Eight; Final Four; National Championship Game	West Georgia; Lincoln (MO); UC Riverside; Assumption; Old Dominion	W 90–89; W 84–83; W 73–59; W 84–73 ^{OT} L 74–76

== Notable players ==
=== Retired jerseys ===
On December 29, 1997, the Privateers retired their first jersey, Ervin Johnson's number 40.

New Orleans Privateers retired jerseys
No.	Player	Position	Career	Year retired
40	Ervin Johnson	C	1989–1993	1997

== See also ==
- List of NCAA Division I men's basketball programs
