= 1972 NCAA College Division basketball tournament =

Edition of USA college basketball tournament

- Teams: 36
- Finals site: Roberts Municipal Stadium, Evansville, Indiana
- Champions: Roanoke Maroons (1st title)
- Runner-up: Akron Zips (2nd title game)
- Semifinalists: Tennessee State Tigers (2nd Final Four); Eastern Michigan Hurons (1st Final Four)
- Winning coach: Charles Moir (1st title)
- MOP: Hal Johnston (Roanoke)
- Attendance: 17,450

The 1972 NCAA College Division basketball tournament involved 36 schools playing in a single-elimination tournament to determine the national champion of men's NCAA College Division college basketball as a culmination of the 1971-72 NCAA College Division men's basketball season. It was won by Roanoke, with Roanoke's Hal Johnston named the Most Outstanding Player.

1972 NCAA Division II Men's sites - first round (white) regionals (cyan) Elite Eight (red)

== Regional participants ==
| School | Outcome |
|---|---|
| Assumption | Regional Champion |
| Bentley | Runner-up |
| Bridgeport | Third Place |
| Sacred Heart | Fourth Place |

| School | Outcome |
|---|---|
| Eastern Michigan | Regional Champion |
| Evansville | Runner-up |
| Kentucky Wesleyan | Third Place |
| Wittenberg | Fourth Place |

| School | Outcome |
|---|---|
| Lincoln (MO) | Runner-up |
| Missouri–St. Louis | Regional Champion |
| South Dakota | Third Place |
| South Dakota State | Fifth Place |
| St. Olaf | Fourth Place |

| School | Outcome |
|---|---|
| Florida Southern | Third Place |
| Mercer | Fourth Place |
| Roanoke | Regional Champion |
| St. Thomas (FL) | Runner-up |

| School | Outcome |
|---|---|
| Alabama State | Fifth Place |
| Delta State | Runner-up |
| LSU–New Orleans | Third Place |
| Tennessee State | Regional Champion |
| Transylvania | Fourth Place |

| School | Outcome |
|---|---|
| Buffalo State | Fourth Place |
| Hartford | Runner-up |
| Ithaca | Third Place |
| Southampton | Regional Champion |

| School | Outcome |
|---|---|
| Akron | Regional Champion |
| Cheyney | Fourth Place |
| Gannon | Fifth Place* |
| Philadelphia U | Third Place |
| Widener | Fifth Place* |
| Youngstown State | Runner-up |

| School | Outcome |
|---|---|
| Seattle Pacific | Runner-up |
| Southern Colorado | Regional Champion |
| UC Irvine | Fourth Place |
| UC Riverside | Third Place |

*denotes tie

== Regionals ==
=== New England - Worcester, Massachusetts ===
Location: Andrew Laska Gymnasium Host: Assumption College

Regional semifinals Round of 32; March 10
Bentley | 96
Sacred Heart | 79
Assumption | 112
Bridgeport | 82

Regional Final; Sweet 16; March 11
Bentley | 103
Assumption | 109

- Third Place - Bridgeport 107, Sacred Heart 89

=== Great Lakes - Evansville, Indiana ===
Location: Roberts Municipal Stadium Host: University of Evansville

Regional semifinals Round of 32; March 9
Eastern Michigan | 61
Kentucky Wesleyan | 59
Evansville | 81
Wittenberg | 73

Regional Final; Sweet 16; March 10
Eastern Michigan | 93
Evansville | 88

- Third Place - Kentucky Wesleyan 68, Wittenberg 64

=== Midwest - St. Louis, Missouri ===
Location: Mark Twain Building Host: University of Missouri-Saint Louis

First round - Northfield, MN; Round of 36; March 6
St. Olaf | 87
South Dakota State | 72

Regional semifinals Round of 32; March 10
Lincoln (MO) | 97
St. Olaf | 81
Missouri-St. Louis | 114
South Dakota | 72

Regional Final; Sweet 16; March 11
Lincoln | 75
Missouri-St. Louis | 84

- Third Place - South Dakota 113, St. Olaf 91

=== South Atlantic - Salem, Virginia ===
Location: Salem Civic Center Host: Roanoke College

Regional semifinals Round of 32; March 9
St. Thomas (FL) | 68
Florida Southern | 62
Roanoke | 78
Mercer | 72

Regional Final; Sweet 16; March 10
St. Thomas | 57
Roanoke | 67

- Third Place - Florida Southern 85, Mercer 83

=== South - Cleveland, Mississippi ===
Location: Walter Sillers Coliseum Host: Delta State University

First round - site unknown Round of 36; March 6
LSU–New Orleans | 80
Alabama State | 72

Regional semifinals Round of 32; March 9
Tennessee State | 80
LSU–New Orleans | 79
Delta State | 71
Transylvania | 59

Regional Final; Sweet 16; March 10
Tennessee State | 79
Delta State | 73

- Third Place - LSU–New Orleans 110, Transylvania 74

=== East - Southampton, New York ===
Location: Southampton Gym Host: Southampton College

Regional semifinals Round of 32; March 10
Hartford | 81
Ithaca | 66
Southampton | 83
Buffalo State | 72

Regional Final; Sweet 16; March 11
Hartford | 74
Southampton | 86

- Third Place - Ithaca 70, Buffalo State 58

=== Mideast - Akron, Ohio ===
Location: Memorial Hall Host: University of Akron

| First round - Reading, PA; Round of 36; March 7 |
| Philadelphia U | 67 |
| Widener | 62 |

| First round - Akron, OH; Round of 36; March 7 |
| Youngstown State | 81 |
| Gannon | 71 |

Regional semifinals Round of 32; March 10
Akron | 54
Philadelphia U | 52
Youngstown State | 90
Cheyney | 80

Regional Final; Sweet 16; March 11
Akron | 87
Youngstown State | 71

- Third Place - Philadelphia U 86, Cheyney 82

=== West - Pueblo, Colorado ===
Location: Massari Arena Host: Southern Colorado State College

Regional semifinals Round of 32; March 10
Seattle Pacific | 68
UC Riverside | 63
Southern Colorado | 77
UC Irvine | 58

Regional Final; Sweet 16; March 11
Seattle Pacific | 83
Southern Colorado | 86

- Third Place - UC Riverside 94, UC Irvine 75

*denotes each overtime played

== National Finals - Evansville, Indiana ==
Location: Roberts Municipal Stadium Host: University of Evansville

National Quarterfinals; Elite Eight; March 15
Assumption | 88
Eastern Michigan | 93
Missouri-St. Louis | 69
Roanoke | 94
Tennessee State | 95
Southampton | 55
Akron | 92
Southern Colorado | 77

National semifinals Final Four; March 16
Eastern Michigan | 73
Roanoke | 99
Tennessee State | 69
Akron | 71*

National Championship; March 17
Roanoke | 84
Akron | 72

- Third Place - Tennessee State 107, Eastern Michigan 82

*denotes each overtime played

== All-tournament team ==
- Hal Johnston (Roanoke)
- Lloyd Neal (Tennessee State)
- Len Paul (Akron)
- Jay Piccola (Roanoke)
- Leonard Robinson (Tennessee State)

Most Outstanding Player: Hal Johnston (Roanoke)

== See also ==
- 1972 NCAA University Division basketball tournament
- 1972 NAIA Basketball Tournament

== Sources ==
- 2010 NCAA Men's Basketball Championship Tournament Records and Statistics: Division II men's basketball Championship
- 1972 NCAA College Division Men's Basketball Tournament jonfmorse.com
