= UC Irvine Anteaters men's basketball =

American men's college basketball team

UC Irvine Anteaters
2026–27 UC Irvine Anteaters men's basketball team
- University: University of California, Irvine
- First season: 1965–66
- Head coach: Russell Turner (17th season)
- Location: Irvine, California
- Arena: Bren Events Center (capacity: 5,000)
- Conference: Big West
- Nickname: Anteaters
- Colors: Blue and gold

NCAA Division I tournament Sweet Sixteen
- 1968*

NCAA Division I tournament appearances
- 2015, 2019; 1968*, 1969*, 1972*, 1975*

Conference tournament champions
- 2015, 2019

Conference regular-season champions
- 2001, 2002, 2014, 2016, 2017, 2019, 2020, 2023, 2024, 2026

Uniforms
Home	Away	Alternate
- * at Division II level

The UC Irvine Anteaters men's basketball team is the basketball team that represents the University of California, Irvine. The team currently competes in the Big West Conference, NCAA Division I.

UC Irvine basketball is in its thirteenth year under current head coach Russell Turner. The Anteaters' main rivals are the Beach of Long Beach State. Program alumni include Portland Trail Blazers associate head coach Scott Brooks and professional football tight end Darren Fells. UC Irvine has appeared two times in the NCAA tournament, most recently in 2019.

== Conference affiliations ==
- 1965–66 to 1976–77 – NCAA Division II Independent
- 1977–78 to present – Big West Conference

== Season-by-season records ==
Record table
Season	Coach	Overall	Conference	Standing	Postseason
Danny Rogers (NCAA Division II Independent) (1965–1967)
1965–66	Danny Rogers	15–11	—	—	—
1966–67	Danny Rogers	15–11	—	—	—
Danny Rogers:		30–22 (.577)			
Dick Davis (NCAA Division II Independent) (1967–1969)
1967–68	Dick Davis	20–8	—	—	NCAA College Division Regional finals
1968–69	Dick Davis	19–9	—	—	NCAA College Division Regional 3rd Place
Dick Davis:		39–17 (.696)			
Tim Tift (NCAA Division II Independent) (1969–1977)
1969–70	Tim Tift	17–9	—	—	—
1970–71	Tim Tift	16–10	—	—	—
1971–72	Tim Tift	16–12	—	—	NCAA College Division Regional 3rd Place
1972–73	Tim Tift	15–13	—	—	—
1973–74	Tim Tift	14–12	—	—	—
1974–75	Tim Tift	16–11 (Note: Does not include victory over Simon Fraser which is not recognized by the NCAA)	—	—	NCAA II Regional 3rd Place
1975–76	Tim Tift	14–12	—	—	—
1976–77	Tim Tift	10–17	—	—	—
Tim Tift (Division 2):		118–96 (.551)			
Tim Tift (Pacific Coast Athletic Association) (1977–1980)
1977–78	Tim Tift	8–17	2–12	8th	—
1978–79	Tim Tift	9–17	3–11	8th	PCAA Tournament Quarterfinals
1979–80	Tim Tift	9–18	1–13	8th	PCAA Tournament Quarterfinals
Tim Tift (Division I):		26–52 (.333)	6–24 (.200)		
Tim Tift:		144–147 (.494)	6–24 (.200)		
Bill Mulligan (Pacific Coast Athletic Association) (1980–1991)
1980–81	Bill Mulligan	17–10	9–5	3rd	PCAA Tournament Quarterfinals
1981–82	Bill Mulligan	23–7	10–4	2nd	PCAA Tournament Semifinals NIT 2nd Round
1982–83	Bill Mulligan	16–12	8–8	5th	PCAA Tournament Quarterfinals
1983–84	Bill Mulligan	19–10	14–4	2nd	PCAA Tournament Semifinals
1984–85	Bill Mulligan	13–17	8–10	6th	PCAA Tournament Quarterfinals
1985–86	Bill Mulligan	17–13	12–6	2nd	PCAA Tournament Quarterfinals NIT 2nd Round
1986–87	Bill Mulligan	14–14	9–9	4th (tie)	PCAA Tournament Quarterfinals
1987–88	Bill Mulligan	16–14	9–9	5th	PCAA Tournament Finals
1988–89	Bill Mulligan	12–17	8–10	8th	Big West Tournament Quarterfinals
1989–90	Bill Mulligan	5–23	3–15	10th	Big West Tournament 1st Round
1990–91	Bill Mulligan	11–19	6–12	9th	—
Bill Mulligan:		163–156 (.511)	96–92 (.511)		
Rod Baker (Big West Conference) (1991–1997)
1991–92	Rod Baker	7–22	3–15	9th	Big West Tournament Semifinals
1992–93	Rod Baker	6–21	4–14	8th	Big West Tournament Quarterfinals
1993–94	Rod Baker	10–20	4–14	10th	Big West Tournament Finals
1994–95	Rod Baker	13–16	6–12	8th	Big West Tournament Semifinals
1995–96	Rod Baker	15–12	11–7	2nd	Big West Tournament Semifinals
1996–97	Rod Baker	1–25	1–15	9th	—
Rod Baker:		52–116 (.310)	29–77 (.274)		
Pat Douglass (Big West Conference) (1997–2010)
1997–98	Pat Douglass	9–18	6–10	3rd (west)	Big West Tournament Quarterfinals
1998–99	Pat Douglass	6–20	2–14	6th (west)	—
1999–00	Pat Douglass	14–14	7–9	3rd (west)	Big West Tournament Quarterfinals
2000–01	Pat Douglass	25–5	15–1	1st	Big West Tournament Semifinals NIT 1st Round
2001–02	Pat Douglass	21–11	13–5	1st (tie)	Big West Tournament Semifinals NIT 1st Round
2002–03	Pat Douglass	20–9	13–5	2nd (tie)	Big West Tournament Semifinals
2003–04	Pat Douglass	11–17	6–12	8th (tie)	—
2004–05	Pat Douglass	16–13	8–10	5th	Big West Tournament Quarterfinals
2005–06	Pat Douglass	16–13	10–4	2nd	Big West Tournament Semifinals
2006–07	Pat Douglass	15–18	6–8	5th	Big West Tournament Semifinals
2007–08	Pat Douglass	18–16	9–7	5th	Big West Tournament Finals
2008–09	Pat Douglass	12–19	8–8	4th (3-way tie)	Big West Tournament 1st Round
2009–10	Pat Douglass	14–18	6–10	7th (tie)	Big West Tournament 1st Round
Pat Douglass:		197–191 (.508)	109–103 (.514)		
Russell Turner (Big West Conference) (2010–present)
2010–11	Russell Turner	13–19	6–10	7th (tie)	Big West Tournament Quarterfinals
2011–12	Russell Turner	12–20	6–10	6th (tie)	Big West Tournament Semifinals
2012–13	Russell Turner	21–16	11–7	4th	Big West Tournament Finals CIT 2nd Round
2013–14	Russell Turner	23–12	13–3	1st	Big West Tournament Semifinals NIT 1st Round
2014–15	Russell Turner	21–13	11–5	2nd (tie)	Big West Tournament Champions NCAA round of 64
2015–16	Russell Turner	28–10	13–3	1st (tie)	Big West Tournament Semifinals CIT Runners Up
2016–17	Russell Turner	21–15	12–4	1st	Big West Tournament Finals NIT 1st Round
2017–18	Russell Turner	18–17	11–5	2nd (tie)	Big West Tournament Finals
2018–19	Russell Turner	31–6	15–1	1st	Big West Tournament Champions NCAA round of 32
2019–20	Russell Turner	21–11	13–3	1st	TOURNAMENT CANCELED (COVID-19)
2020–21	Russell Turner	18–9	10–4	2nd	Big West Tournament Finals
2021–22	Russell Turner	15–10	9–5	4th	Big West Tournament Quarterfinals
2022–23	Russell Turner	23–12	15–5	1st (tie)	Big West Tournament Semifinals NIT First Round
2023–24	Russell Turner	24–10	17-3	1st	Big West Tournament Semifinals NIT First Round
2024–25	Russell Turner	32–7	17-3	2nd	Big West Tournament Finals NIT Runner-Up
2025–26	Russell Turner	23–12	15–5	1st	NIT First Round
2026–27	Russell Turner	0–0	0–0		
Russell Turner:		343–197 (.635)	194–76 (.719)		
Total:		932–832 (.528)			
National champion Postseason invitational champion Conference regular season champion Conference regular season and conference tournament champion Division regular season champion Division regular season and conference tournament champion Conference tournament champion

== Postseason results ==
=== NCAA Division I tournament results ===
The Anteaters have appeared in the NCAA Division I Tournament two times. Their combined record is 1–2.

Year	Seed	Round	Opponent	Result
2015	#13	First round	#4 Louisville	L 55–57
2019	#13	First round Second Round	#4 Kansas State #12 Oregon	W 70–64; L 54–73

=== NCAA Division II tournament results ===
The Anteaters have appeared in the NCAA Division II Tournament four times. Their combined record is 2–6.

Year	Round	Opponent	Result
1968	Regional semifinals Regional Finals	San Diego State; UNLV	W 78–69; L 74–79
1969	Regional semifinals Regional 3rd-place game	San Francisco State; UC Davis	L 55–81; W 82–70
1972	Regional semifinals Regional 3rd-place game	Southern Colorado; UC Riverside	L 58–77; L 75–94
1975	Regional semifinals Regional 3rd-place game	Puget Sound; UC Davis	L 74–76 ^{OT} L 70–84

=== NIT results ===
The Anteaters have appeared in ten National Invitation Tournaments (NIT). Their combined record is 6–10.

Year	Round	Opponent	Result
1982	First Round; Second Round	San Diego State; Oklahoma	W 70–69; L 77–80
1986	First Round; Second Round	UCLA; BYU	W 80–74; L 80–93
2001	First Round	Tulsa	L 71–75
2002	First Round	BYU	L 55–78
2014	First Round	SMU	L 54–68
2017	First Round	Illinois State	L 71–85
2023	First Round	Oregon	L 58–84
2024	First Round	Utah	L 75–84
2025	First Round; Second Round; Quarterfinals; Semifinals; Championship	Northern Colorado; Jacksonville State; UAB; North Texas; Chattanooga	W 82–72; W 66–61; W 81–77^{OT} W 69–67; L 84–85^{OT}
2026	First Round	UNLV	L 72–75

=== CIT results ===
The Anteaters have appeared in two CollegeInsider.com Postseason Tournaments (CIT). Their combined record is 4–2.

Year	Round	Opponent	Result
2013	First Round; Second Round	High Point; Oral Roberts	W 80–71; L 62–76
2016	First Round; Quarterfinals; Semifinals; Championship Game	North Dakota; Louisiana–Lafayette; Coastal Carolina; Columbia	W 89–86^{OT} W 67–66; W 66–47; L 67–73

== Honors and awards ==
=== Retired numbers ===
The Anteaters retired their first number in program history in 1995, honoring number 44 for All-American Kevin Magee. He was joined by Scott Brooks when his number 12 was retired on November 30, 2019.

UC Irvine Anteaters retired numbers
No.	Player	Pos.	Career	No. ret.	Ref.
12	Scott Brooks	PG	1985–1987	2019	
44	Kevin Magee	PF / C	1980–1982	1995	

== Anteaters in the NBA ==
- Scott Brooks, 1988–1999, Cleveland Cavaliers, Dallas Mavericks, Houston Rockets, Minnesota Timberwolves, New York Knicks, Philadelphia 76ers
- Wayne Engelstad, 1988–1989, Denver Nuggets
- Ronnie Grandison, 1988–1996, Atlanta Hawks, Boston Celtics, Charlotte Hornets, Miami Heat, New York Knicks
- Ben McDonald, 1985–1989, Cleveland Cavaliers, Golden State Warriors
- Tod Murphy, 1987–1994, Detroit Pistons, Golden State Warriors, Los Angeles Clippers, Minnesota Timberwolves
- Johnny Rogers, 1986–1988, Cleveland Cavaliers, Sacramento Kings
- Bob Thornton, 1986–1996, Minnesota Timberwolves, New York Knicks, Philadelphia 76ers, Utah Jazz, Washington Wizards
- Tom Tolbert, 1988–1995, Charlotte Hornets, Golden State Warriors, Los Angeles Clippers, Orlando Magic
