= 1969 NCAA College Division basketball tournament =

Edition of USA college basketball tournament

- Teams: 32
- Finals site: Roberts Municipal Stadium, Evansville, Indiana
- Champions: Kentucky Wesleyan Panthers (3rd title)
- Runner-up: SW Missouri State Bears (3rd title game)
- Semifinalists: American International Yellow Jackets* (1st Final Four); Ashland Eagles (2nd Final Four)
- Winning coach: Bob Daniels (2nd title)
- MOP: George Tinsley (Kentucky Wesleyan)
- Attendance: 30,003

The 1969 NCAA College Division basketball tournament involved 32 schools playing in a single-elimination tournament to determine the national champion of men's NCAA College Division college basketball as a culmination of the 1968–69 NCAA College Division men's basketball season. It was won by Kentucky Wesleyan College, with Kentucky Wesleyan's George Tinsley named the Most Outstanding Player.

1969 NCAA Division II Men's sites - regionals (cyan) Elite Eight (red)

American International College's tournament and semifinal appearances were later vacated due to NCAA rules violations.

== Regional participants ==
School	Outcome
Mount St. Mary's	Runner-up
Norfolk State	Third Place
Oglethorpe	Regional Champion
Old Dominion	Fourth Place

School	Outcome
Alcorn State	Runner-up
Bellarmine	Fourth Place
Kentucky Wesleyan	Regional Champion
Transylvania	Third Place

School	Outcome
San Francisco State	Regional Champion
UC Davis	Fourth Place
UC Irvine	Third Place
UNLV	Runner-up

School	Outcome
American International*	Regional Champion
Assumption	Third Place
Central Connecticut State	Fourth Place
Springfield	Runner-up

School	Outcome
Albany (NY)	Third Place
Le Moyne	Fourth Place
Montclair State	Regional Champion
Wagner	Runner-up

School	Outcome
Lincoln (MO)	Third Place
South Dakota State	Runner-up
SW Missouri State	Regional Champion
St. Olaf	Fourth Place

School	Outcome
Concordia (IL)	Fourth Place
Illinois State	Regional Champion
North Park	Third Place
Valparaiso	Runner-up

School	Outcome
Ashland	Regional Champion
Cheyney	Runner-up
Philadelphia Textile	Third Place
Wittenberg	Fourth Place

*tournament appearance vacated

== Regionals ==
=== South Atlantic - Norfolk, Virginia ===
Location: unknown Host: Norfolk State University

Regional semifinals Round of 32; March 7
Oglethorpe	68
Old Dominion	60
Mount St. Mary's	95
Norfolk State	80

Regional Final; Sweet 16; March 8
Oglethorpe	74
Mount St. Mary's	56

- Third Place - Norfolk State 113, Old Dominion 102

=== South - Owensboro, Kentucky ===
Location: Owensboro Sportscenter Host: Kentucky Wesleyan College

Regional semifinals Round of 32; March 7
Alcorn State	76
Bellarmine	75
Kentucky Wesleyan	77
Transylvania	61

Regional Final; Sweet 16; March 8
Alcorn State	79
Kentucky Wesleyan	83

- Third Place - Transylvania 65, Bellarmine 64

=== Far West - Las Vegas, Nevada ===
Location: Las Vegas Convention Center Host: University of Nevada, Las Vegas

Regional semifinals Round of 32; March 7
San Francisco State	81
UC Irvine	55
UNLV	84
UC Davis	81

Regional Final; Sweet 16; March 8
San Francisco State	77
UNLV	72

- Third Place - UC Irvine 82, UC Davis 70

=== New England - Springfield, Massachusetts ===
Location: Butova Gymnasium Host: American International College

Regional semifinals Round of 32; March 7
Springfield	91
Central Connecticut State	80
~~American International~~	79
Assumption	77

Regional Final; Sweet 16; March 8
Springfield	68
~~American International~~	91

- Third Place - Assumption 98, Central Connecticut State 77

=== East - DeWitt, New York ===
Location: Le Moyne Athletic Center Host: Le Moyne College

Regional semifinals Round of 32; March 7
Wagner	109
Albany (NY)	64
Montclair State	81
Le Moyne	77

Regional Final; Sweet 16; March 8
Wagner	78
Montclair State	101

- Third Place - Albany (NY) 71, Le Moyne 70

Note: The 2010 edition of the NCAA's Division II Men's Basketball Championship record book reports the score of the Montclair State–Le Moyne game as a 79–75 Montclair State win. The score was widely reported in the news media as 81–77. Some newspapers reported the score as 81–75. Le Moyne, which hosted the game, shows the score as 81–77 in its all-time results.

=== Midwest - Springfield, Missouri ===
Location: McDonald Hall and Arena Host: Southwest Missouri State University

Regional semifinals Round of 32; March 7
South Dakota State	79
Lincoln (MO)	77
SW Missouri State	75
St. Olaf	47

Regional Final; Sweet 16; March 8
South Dakota State	74
SW Missouri State	87

- Third Place - Lincoln 77, St. Olaf 72

=== Great Lakes - Valparaiso, Indiana ===
Location: Hilltop Gym Host: Valparaiso University

Regional semifinals Round of 32; March 7
Illinois State	87
North Park	82
Valparaiso	91
Concordia (IL)	81

Regional Final; Sweet 16; March 8
Illinois State	103
Valparaiso	87

- Third Place - North Park 90, Concordia 73

=== Mideast - Ashland, Ohio ===
Location: Kates Gymnasium Host: Ashland University

Regional semifinals Round of 32; March 7
Cheyney	84
Wittenberg	70
Ashland	43
Philadelphia Textile	40

Regional Final; Sweet 16; March 8
Cheyney	56
Ashland	66

- Third Place - Philadelphia Textile 76, Wittenberg 74

*denotes each overtime played

== National Finals - Evansville, Indiana ==
Location: Roberts Municipal Stadium Host: University of Evansville

National Quarterfinals; Elite Eight; March 12
Oglethorpe	68
Kentucky Wesleyan	82
San Francisco State	75
~~American International~~	80
Montclair State	76
SW Missouri State	92
Illinois State	35
Ashland	41

National semifinals Final Four; March 13
Kentucky Wesleyan	83*
~~American International~~	82
SW Missouri State	58
Ashland	48

National Championship; March 14
Kentucky Wesleyan	75
SW Missouri State	71

- Third Place - American International 53, Ashland 51

*denotes each overtime played

== All-Tournament team ==
- Mert Bancroft (Southwest Missouri State)
- Tommy Hobgood (Kentucky Wesleyan)
- Curtis Perry (Southwest Missouri State)
- Bob Rutherford (American International)
- George Tinsley (Kentucky Wesleyan)

== See also ==
- 1969 NCAA University Division basketball tournament
- 1969 NAIA Basketball Tournament

== Sources ==
- 2010 NCAA Men's Basketball Championship Tournament Records and Statistics: Division II men's basketball Championship
- 1969 NCAA College Division Men's Basketball Tournament jonfmorse.com
