= C. David Baker =

President and CEO of the Pro Football Hall of Fame

President & CEO of the Pro Football Hall of Fame
- In office January 6, 2014 – October 16, 2021
- Preceded by: Stephen Perry
- Succeeded by: Jim Porter

Commissioner of the Arena Football League
- In office November 8, 1996 – July 25, 2008
- Preceded by: Jim Drucker
- Succeeded by: Ed Policy

Mayor of Irvine, California
- In office July 9, 1985 – July 8, 1986
- Preceded by: David Sills
- Succeeded by: Larry Agran

Member of the Irvine City Council
- In office July 10, 1984 – 1988

Personal details
- Born: Carl David Baker; February 16, 1953 (age 73) Los Angeles County, California, U.S.
- Party: Republican
- Education: University of California, Irvine (B.A.); Pepperdine University (J.D.)

Carl David Baker (born February 16, 1953) is an American former football executive and politician. He was President and CEO of the Pro Football Hall of Fame in Canton, Ohio from 2014 to 2021.

Baker was raised in Downey, California, the son of a lumber mill worker father and foster child caregiver mother. He earned a Bachelor of Arts degree in English Literature and Criticism from the University of California, Irvine and his Juris Doctor from the Pepperdine University School of Law, during which time he served as the Editor-in-Chief of the Pepperdine Law Review.

One of Baker's more imposing aspects is his size, standing at 6 feet 9 inches (2.06 m) tall and weighing around 400 pounds (180 kg). He was a basketball power forward at UC Irvine from 1971–75 where he established the school record for career rebounds (926) that stood for 44 years until broken by Jonathan Galloway in 2019. Baker also played two seasons of professional basketball in Switzerland before attending law school.

Baker was a City Councilman of Irvine, California in the mid-1980s. He left his political career in 1988 after being convicted of forgery in California for attempting to forge a $48,000 check from the nonprofit Irvine Health Foundation (of which he was executive director) for use as campaign funds during a run for a Congressional seat.

On November 8, 1996, Baker became the fourth commissioner of the Arena Football League. He started in the league as the owner of the Anaheim Piranhas, which he left after a single season of owning the team to become league commissioner. Baker resigned as Arena Football League Commissioner at ArenaBowl XXII, on July 25, 2008, after almost twelve years as commissioner.

From 2009 to 2014, he was Managing Partner for Union Village, an integrated health care village in Henderson, Nevada.

On January 2, 2014, Baker was announced as the President of the Pro Football Hall of Fame. In his first three years of leadership at the Hall, the organization's net assets grew 161%. He was also involved in the Hall of Fame Village, a mixed-use development surrounding the Hall of Fame.

On November 28, 2017, Baker received the March of Dimes Sports Leadership Award.

On October 16, 2021, Baker announced his retirement as the president of the Pro Football Hall of Fame.

== Personal life ==
Baker and his wife Colleen were married in the 1990s after both being divorced for several years. Baker has two sons from a prior marriage, along with a stepson and stepdaughter. One of his sons is Sam Baker, who played for the Atlanta Falcons as an offensive tackle. Baker is a Christian.
