= UC Davis Aggies men's basketball =

Collegiate basketball team

2026–27 UC Davis Aggies men's basketball team
- University: University of California, Davis
- First season: 1910–11; 116 years ago
- Head coach: Jim Les (16th season)
- Location: Davis, California
- Arena: University Credit Union Center (capacity: 5,931)
- Conference: Mountain West
- Nickname: Aggies
- Colors: Yale blue and gold

NCAA Division I tournament champions
- 1998 (Division II)
Other NCAA Division I tournament results
Final Four	1998 (Division II)
Elite Eight	1998 (Division II)
Appearances	Division I: 2017; Division II: 1967, 1968, 1969, 1975, 1976, 1978, 1995, 1996, 1997, 1998, 1999, 2000

Conference tournament champions
- Big West Conference: 2017; Northern California Athletic Conference: 1995, 1996, 1997, 1998

Conference regular-season champions
- Division I: 2015, 2018; Division II: 1939, 1940, 1952, 1967, 1968, 1969, 1975, 1976, 1978, 1995, 1996, 1997, 1998, 1999, 2000

Uniforms
Home	Away

The UC Davis Aggies men's basketball team represents University of California, Davis in Davis, California, United States. The team currently competes in the Mountain West Conference (MW).

The team is led by head coach Jim Les, who is in his 15th season at the helm during the 2025–26 season. During his tenure with the Aggies, the men's basketball team earned its first Big West championship and first NCAA Men's Basketball Division I Tournament. That appearance in the 2017 Tournament marked the thirteenth overall NCAA postseason appearance including its time in Division II.

Before it became a full-fledged Division I program on July 1, 2007, UC Davis won an NCAA Division II national championship in 1998.

== Season results ==
Below is a table of UC Davis's yearly records. The Aggies did not sponsor a team in the 1943–44 and 1944–45 seasons.

Record table
Season	Coach	Overall	Conference	Standing	Postseason
Howard Phillips (Division II Independent) (1910–1912)
1910–11	Howard Phillips	2–4			
1911–12	Howard Phillips	7–4			
Howard Phillips:		9–8 (.529)			
H. S. Baird (Division II Independent) (1912–1915)
1912–13	H. S. Baird	7–1			
1913–14	H. S. Baird	7–5			
1914–15	H. S. Baird	3–9			
H. S. Baird:		17–15 (.531)			
R. A. Harmon (Division II Independent) (1915–1916)
1915–16	R. A. Harmon	3–6			
R. A. Harmon:		3–6 (.333)			
E. B. Blabee (Division II Independent) (1916–1917)
1916–17	E. B. Blabee	2–7			
E. B. Blabee:		2–7 (.222)			
J. D. Marquardt (Division II Independent) (1917–1918)
1917–18	J. D. Marquardt	3–7			
J. D. Marquardt:		3–7 (.300)			
Red Harper (Division II Independent) (1918–1919)
1918–19	Red Harper	0–1			
Red Harper:		0–1 (.000)			
Doc Seawright (Division II Independent) (1919–1921)
1919–20	Doc Seawright	5–6			
1920–21	Doc Seawright	0–1			
Doc Seawright:		5–7 (.417)			
W. D. Elfrink (Division II Independent) (1921–1922)
1921–22	W. D. Elfrink	2–5			
W. D. Elfrink:		2–5 (.286)			
Chester Brewer (Division II Independent) (1922–1923)
1922–23	Chester Brewer	10–3			
Chester Brewer:		10–3 (.769)			
Bill Driver (Division II Independent) (1923–1925)
1923–24	Bill Driver	11–5			
1924–25	Bill Driver	3–9			
Division II Independent:		65–73 (.471)			
Bill Driver (Far West Conference) (1925–1927)
1925–26	Bill Driver	1–14	0–8	5th	
1926–27	Bill Driver	2–8	0–4	3rd	
Bill Driver:		17–36 (.395)	0–12 (.000)		
Woody Wilson (Far West Conference) (1927–1928)
1927–28	Woody Wilson	2–11	0–8	5th	
Crip Toomey (Far West Conference) (1928–1936)
1928–29	Crip Toomey	1–12	0–8	5th	
1929–30	Crip Toomey	9–12	1–9	6th	
1930–31	Crip Toomey	9–5	5–5	N/A	
1931–32	Crip Toomey	8–10	4–6	т-3rd	
1932–33	Crip Toomey	13–9	7–3	т-2nd	
1933–34	Crip Toomey	5–11	2–6	5th	
1934–35	Crip Toomey	7–12	3–7	5th	
1935–36	Crip Toomey	3–18	3–5	т-3rd	
Crip Toomey:		55–89 (.382)	25–49 (.338)		
George Stromgren (Far West Conference) (1936–1943)
1936–37	George Stromgren	6–15	3–5	3rd	
1937–38	George Stromgren	6–15	2–6	т-4th	
1938–39	George Stromgren	18–8	8–0	1st	
1939–40	George Stromgren	14–7	8–0	1st	
1940–41	George Stromgren	5–18	0–6	4th	
1941–42	George Stromgren	3–16	1–5	4th	
1942–43	George Stromgren	2–6	N/A	N/A	
Woody Wilson (Far West Conference) (1945–1946)
1945–46	Woody Wilson	2–13	N/A	N/A	
Woody Wilson:		4–24 (.143)	0–8 (.000)		
George Stromgren (Far West Conference) (1946–1951)
1946–47	George Stromgren	7–15	N/A	N/A	
1947–48	George Stromgren	2–18	2–14	5th	
1948–49	George Stromgren	13–12	6–10	5th	
1949–50	George Stromgren	15–8	8–4	2nd	
1950–51	George Stromgren	2–22	2–6	4th	
Carl Boyer (Far West Conference) (1951–1952)
1951–52	Carl Boyer	13–10	9–3	1st	
Carl Boyer:		13–10 (.565)	9–3 (.750)		
George Stromgren (Far West Conference) (1952–1957)
1952–53	George Stromgren	7–16	2–10	4th	
1953–54	George Stromgren	3–17	2–8	5th	
1954–55	George Stromgren	2–16	1–9	6th	
1955–56	George Stromgren	3–17	0–10	6th	
1956–57	George Stromgren	4–18	1–9	6th	
George Stromgren:		122–244 (.315)	46–102 (.311)		
Herb Schmalenberger (Far West Conference) (1957–1958)
1957–58	Herb Schmalenberger	5–17	0–10	6th	
Herb Schmalenberger:		5–17 (.227)	0–10 (.000)		
Jim Sells (Far West Conference) (1958–1963)
1958–59	Jim Sells	5–17	0–10	6th	
1959–60	Jim Sells	4–22	2–8	6th	
1960–61	Jim Sells	4–17	3–7	4th	
1961–62	Jim Sells	7–17	5–7	5th	
1962–63	Jim Sells	5–15	3–9	7th	
Jim Sells:		25–88 (.221)	13–41 (.241)		
Joe Carlson (Far West Conference) (1963–1967)
1963–64	Joe Carlson	7–15	4–8	5th	
1964–65	Joe Carlson	13–10	5–7	3rd	
1965–66	Joe Carlson	15–7	7–5	2nd	
1966–67	Joe Carlson	21–7	12–2	1st	NCAA College Div. first round
Joe Carlson:		56–39 (.589)	28–22 (.560)		
Bob Hamilton (Far West Conference) (1967–1982)
1967–68	Bob Hamilton	17–11	12–2	1st	NCAA College Div. first round
1968–69	Bob Hamilton	18–10	12–2	т-1st	NCAA College Div. first round
1969–70	Bob Hamilton	15–9	8–4	2nd	
1970–71	Bob Hamilton	9–16	8–4	2nd	
1971–72	Bob Hamilton	11–14	6–6	т-3rd	
1972–73	Bob Hamilton	14–12	8–4	3rd	
1973–74	Bob Hamilton	13–13	8–4	3rd	
1974–75	Bob Hamilton	16–12	9–1	1st	NCAA Div. II first round
1975–76	Bob Hamilton	18–10	10–2	т-1st	NCAA Div. II first round
1976–77	Bob Hamilton	14–12	8–4	т-1st	
1977–78	Bob Hamilton	19–10	9–3	1st	NCAA Div. II first round
1978–79	Bob Hamilton	12–14	8–4	т-1st	
1979–80	Bob Hamilton	9–18	6–6	4th	
1980–81	Bob Hamilton	15–12	6–6	4th	
1981–82	Bob Hamilton	8–16	5–7	т-4th	
Far West Conference:		481–753 (.390)	252–306 (.452)		
Bob Hamilton (Northern California Athletic Conference) (1982–1989)
1982–83	Bob Hamilton	8–19	6–8	6th	
1983–84	Bob Hamilton	13–13	7–7	5th	
1984–85	Bob Hamilton	13–15	9–5	3rd	
1985–86	Bob Hamilton	17–11	7–5	3rd	
1986–87	Bob Hamilton	12–16	8–4	3rd	
1987–88	Bob Hamilton	14–15	7–5	4th	
1988–89	Bob Hamilton	16–13	11–3	т-2nd	
Bob Hamilton:		301–291 (.508)	178–96 (.650)		
Lonnie Williams (Northern California Athletic Conference) (1989–1990)
1989–90	Lonnie Williams	11–16	7–7	4th	
Lonnie Williams:		11–16 (.407)	7–7 (.500)		
Bob Williams (Northern California Athletic Conference) (1990–1998)
1990–91	Bob Williams	20–8	11–3	2nd	
1991–92	Bob Williams	19–11	11–3	2nd	
1992–93	Bob Williams	13–14	9–5	3rd	
1993–94	Bob Williams	11–15	7–7	5th	
1994–95	Bob Williams	20–11	13–1	1st	NCAA Div. II Semifinals
1995–96	Bob Williams	24–6	14–0	1st	NCAA Div. II Semifinals
1996–97	Bob Williams	20–9	11–3	т-1st	NCAA Div. II First round
1997–98	Bob Williams	31–2	14–0	1st	NCAA Div. II National Champions
Bob Williams:		158–76 (.675)	90–22 (.804)		
NCAC:		262–194 (.575)	152–66 (.697)		
Brian Fogel (California Collegiate Athletic Association) (1998–2003)
1998–99	Brian Fogel	22–6	18–4	1st	NCAA Div. II First round
1999–00	Brian Fogel	22–7	16–6	т-2nd	NCAA Div. II Second Round
2000–01	Brian Fogel	18–9	15–7	3rd	
2001–02	Brian Fogel	15–12	12–10	5th	
2002–03	Brian Fogel	12–15	9–13	т-7th	
Brian Fogel:		89–45 (.664)	70–40 (.636)		
Gary Stewart (California Collegiate Athletic Association) (2003–2004)
2003–04	Gary Stewart	18–9	15–7	4th	
CCAA:		107–54 (.665)	85–47 (.644)		
Gary Stewart (Division I Independent) (2004–2007)
2004–05	Gary Stewart	11–17			Ineligible
2005–06	Gary Stewart	8–20			Ineligible
2006–07	Gary Stewart	5–23			Ineligible
Division I Independent:		24–60 (.286)			
Gary Stewart (Big West Conference) (2007–2011)
2007–08	Gary Stewart	9–22	2–14	9th	
2008–09	Gary Stewart	13–19	7–9	т-7th	
2009–10	Gary Stewart	14–18	8–8	т-3rd	
2010–11	Gary Stewart	10–20	4–12	9th	
Gary Stewart:		88–148 (.373)	36–50 (.419)		
Jim Les (Big West Conference) (2011–Present)
2011–12	Jim Les	5–26	3–13	8th	
2012–13	Jim Les	14–17	9–9	6th	
2013–14	Jim Les	9–22	4–14	9th	
2014–15	Jim Les	25–7	14–2	1st	NIT first round
2015–16	Jim Les	11–19	6–10	5th	
2016–17	Jim Les	23–13	11–5	2nd	NCAA first round
2017–18	Jim Les	22–11	12–4	1st	NIT first round
2018–19	Jim Les	11–20	7–9	6th	
2019–20	Jim Les	14–18	8–8	5th	Cancelled due to COVID-19 pandemic
2020–21	Jim Les	10–8	6–4	4th	
2021–22	Jim Les	13–11	5–6	7th	
2022–23	Jim Les	18–14	11–8	6th	
2023–24	Jim Les	20–13	14–6	3rd	
2024–25	Jim Les	15–17	9–11	6th	
Jim Les:		210–216 (.493)	119–107 (.527)		
Big West Conference:		247–263 (.484)	140–152 (.479)		
Total:		1,185–1,429 (.453)			
National champion Postseason invitational champion Conference regular season champion Conference regular season and conference tournament champion Division regular season champion Division regular season and conference tournament champion Conference tournament champion

== Postseason ==
=== NCAA Division I Tournament ===
The Aggies earned their first NCAA Division I men's basketball tournament appearance with a 50–47 victory over UC Irvine in the Big West Tournament's 2017 championship game, hosted by the Honda Center in Anaheim, California.

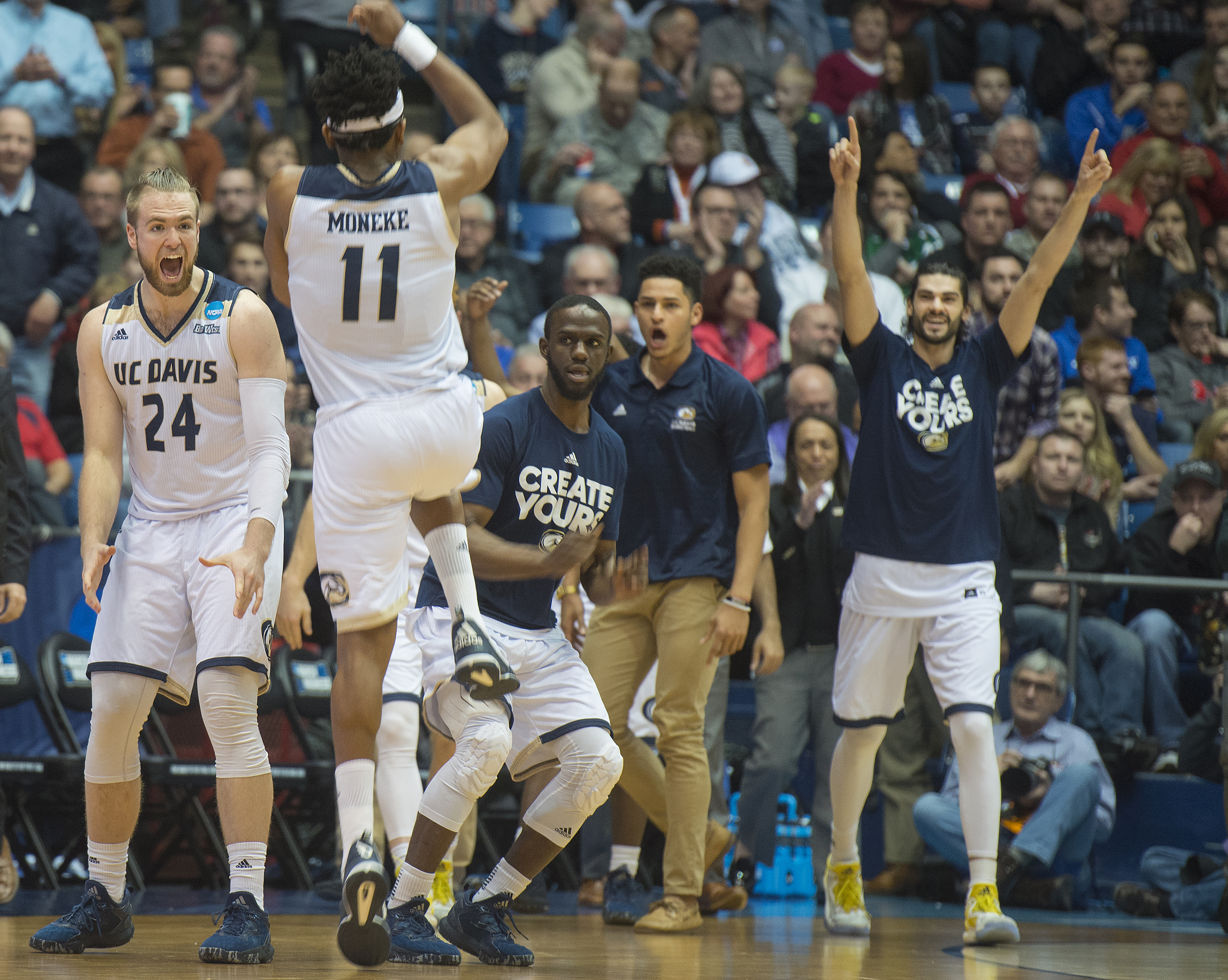
The Aggies celebrating vs North Carolina Central in 2017

Year	Round	Opponent	Result
2017	First Four; First round	North Carolina Central; Kansas	W 67–63; L 62–100

=== NCAA Division II Tournament ===
The Aggies appeared in the NCAA Division II Tournament 12 times and ended the 1997–98 season as national champions.

Year	Round	Opponent	Result
1967	Regional semifinals Regional 3rd-place game	UNLV; Portland State	L 83–100; W 81–61
1968	Regional semifinals Regional 3rd-place game	UNLV; San Diego State	L 91–96; L 72–79
1969	Regional semifinals Regional 3rd-place game	UNLV; UC Riverside	L 81–84; L, 70–84
1975	Regional semifinals Regional 3rd-place game	UC Riverside; UC Irvine	L 77–78; W 84–70
1976	Regional semifinals Regional 3rd-place game	Cal State Bakersfield; Cal Poly Pomona	L 65–87; L 82–84 ^{OT}
1978	Regional semifinals Regional 3rd-place game	Cal State Northridge; Puget Sound	L 73–79; L 73–96
1995	Regional Quarterfinals; Regional semifinals Regional 3rd-place game	Grand Canyon; UC Riverside; Cal State Los Angeles	W 92–88 ^{OT} L 66–84; L 74–78
1996	Regional Quarterfinals; Regional semifinals	Montana State–Billings; Seattle Pacific	W 89–80; L 65–79
1997	Regional Quarterfinals	Grand Canyon	L 66–78
1998	Regional semifinals Regional Finals; Elite Eight; Final Four; National Championship Game	Cal State Los Angeles; Seattle Pacific; West Texas A&M; Saint Rose; Kentucky Wesleyan	W 53–51; W 80–52; W 63–55; W 88–76; W 83–77
1999	Regional semifinals	Seattle Pacific	L 68–73
2000	Regional Quarterfinals; Regional semifinals	BYU–Hawaiʻi; Seattle Pacific	W 60–53; L 61–68

=== National Invitation Tournament ===
The Aggies appeared in the National Invitation Tournament (NIT) twice, their combined record is 0–2.

Year	Round	Opponent	Result
2015	First Round	Stanford	L 64–77
2018	First Round	Utah	L 59–69

== Awards ==
Since becoming a full-fledged Division I program in July, 2007, UC Davis men's basketball (and its student-athletes) won multiple NCAA statistical championships and major conference awards.

- NCAA Three-Point Champions (Team): 2015
- NCAA Three-Point Champions (Individual): Stefan Gonzalez (2019–20), Corey Hawkins (2014–15)

All-America Selection

- Corey Hawkins (Associated Press Honorable Mention, 2014–15; Lou Henson Mid-Major, 2014–15)

Mid-Major Freshman All-America Selections

- Corey Hawkins (CollegeInsider.com, 2012–13)
- Josh Ritchart (CollegeInsider.com, 2010–11)
- Julian Welch (CollegeInsider.com, 2009–10)
- Mark Payne (CollegeInsider.com, 2008–09)

Big West Conference Awards

- Big West Conference Player of the Year: TJ Shorts II (2017–18), Corey Hawkins (2014–15)
- Big West Conference Newcomer of the Year: TJ Shorts II (2017–18), Chima Moneke (2016–17)
- Big West Conference Freshman of the Year: Ezra Manjon (2019–20), Josh Ritchart (2011–12), Julian Welch (2009–10), Mark Payne (2007–08)
- Big West Conference Coach of the Year: Jim Les (2017–18, 2014–15)

TJ Shorts II is the first player to win the Big West's top two individual awards in league history.

Big West Conference — All-Specialty Awards

- Best Sixth Player: Siler Schneider (2016–17), Josh Fox (2014–15)
- Best Hustle Player: Darius Graham (2016–17, 2015–16), Joe Harden (2010–11, 2009–10)

== Notable players ==
- Brynton Lemar (born 1995), American-born Jamaican basketball player for Hapoel Jerusalem of the Israeli Basketball Premier League

Chima Moneke T.J Shorts II
