= UC Riverside Highlanders men's basketball =

2025–26 UC Riverside Highlanders men's basketball team
- University: University of California, Riverside
- Head coach: Gus Argenal (1st season)
- Conference: Big West
- Location: Riverside, California
- Arena: Student Recreation Center Arena (capacity: 3,168)
- Nickname: Highlanders
- Colors: Blue and gold

Uniforms
Home	Away	Alternate

NCAA tournament runner-up
- Division II: 1995
Other NCAA tournament results
Final Four	Division II: 1970, 1989, 1995
Elite Eight	Division II: 1970, 1973, 1974, 1975, 1980, 1989, 1995
Sweet Sixteen	Division II: 1970, 1973, 1974, 1975, 1979, 1980, 1988, 1989, 1992, 1994, 1995
Appearances	Division II: 1970, 1972, 1973, 1974, 1975, 1979, 1980, 1984, 1986, 1988, 1989, 1990, 1991, 1992, 1994, 1995, 1997

The UC Riverside Highlanders men's basketball team represents the University of California, Riverside in Riverside, California, United States. The school's team currently competes in the Big West Conference and their head coach is Gus Argenal, who is in his first year with the program. The Highlanders play their home games at the Student Recreation Center Arena. The program had its greatest success as a Division II program, making it to three Final Fours and the national title game in 1995.

In 2020, the future of the program was placed into doubt, as UC Riverside's leadership reportedly began considering cutting the university's entire athletics department in response to financial strain caused by the COVID-19 pandemic. However, in May 2021, the university announced that they had decided against eliminating athletics and will continue competing at the NCAA Division I level in all sports, thus saving the men's basketball program from extinction.

== Postseason ==
=== NIT results ===
The Highlanders have appeared in the National Invitation Tournament (NIT) one time. Their record is 0–1.

Year	Round	Opponent	Result
2025	First Round	Santa Clara	L 62–101

=== NCAA Division II Tournament results ===
The Highlanders appeared in the NCAA Division II Tournament 17 times (named the College Division Tournament until 1973). Their combined record was 29–18.

Year	Round	Opponent	Result
1970	Regional semifinals Regional Finals; Elite Eight; Final Four; National 3rd-place game	Boise State; Puget Sound; Saint Joseph's (IN); Philadelphia Textile; Buffalo State	W 83–71; W 83–71; W 82–77; L 63–79; W 94–83
1972	Regional semifinals Regional 3rd-place game	Seattle Pacific; UC Irvine	L 63–68; W 94–75
1973	Regional Quarterfinals; Regional semifinals Regional Finals; Elite Eight	Somona State; Puget Sound; Cal State Bakersfield; Brockport State	W 70–68; W 71–51; W 61–54; L 70–79
1974	Regional semifinals Regional Finals; Elite Eight	Chico State; Somona State; New Orleans	W 62–51; W 71–56; L 78–83
1975	Regional semifinals Regional Finals; Elite Eight	UC Davis; Puget Sound; New Orleans	W 78–77; W 59–58; L 59–73
1979	Regional semifinals Regional Finals	San Diego; Puget Sound	W 62–48; L 52–77
1980	Regional semifinals Regional Finals; Elite Eight	Puget Sound; Cal Poly SLO; North Alabama	W 65–61; W 62–53; L 69–76
1984	Regional semifinals Regional 3rd-place game	San Francisco State; Chapman	L 57–65; W 74–71
1986	Regional semifinals Regional 3rd-place game	Alaska-Anchorage; Cal Poly SLO	L 83–86; W 55–53
1988	Regional semifinals Regional Finals	St. Cloud State; Ferris State	W 78–71; L 64–80
1989	Regional semifinals Regional Finals; Elite Eight; Final Four; National 3rd-place game	Somona State; Cal State Bakersfield; Millersville; Southeast Missouri State; Jacksonville State	W 79–65; W 63–60; W 92–86; L 83–84 ^{OT} W 90–81
1990	Regional semifinals Regional 3rd-place game	Central Missouri State; Humboldt State	L 59–69; L 70–71
1991	Regional semifinals Regional 3rd-place game	Cal State Bakersfield; Chico State	L 52–75; W 90–82
1992	Regional semifinals Regional Finals	Grand Canyon; Cal State Bakersfield	W 74–61; L 70–72 ^{OT}
1994	Regional semifinals Regional Finals	San Francisco State; Cal State Bakersfield	W 78–61; L 62–75
1995	Regional semifinals Regional Finals; Elite Eight; Final Four; National Championship Game	UC Davis; Seattle Pacific; Morningside; Indiana (PA); Southern Indiana	W 84–66; W 74–68; W 71–58; W 73–69; L 63–71
1997	Regional Quarterfinals	Montana State-Billings	L 86–97

== Season-by-season results ==
Statistics overview
Season	Coach	Overall	Conference	Standing	Postseason
John Masi (Big West Conference) (2001–2005)
2001–02	John Masi	8–18	5–13	9th	
2002–03	John Masi	6–18	5–13	9th	
2003–04	John Masi	11–17	7–11	T–5th	
2004–05	John Masi	9–19	4–14	9th	
Masi:		34–72 (.321)	21–51 (.292)		
David Spencer (Big West Conference) (2005–2006)
2005–06	David Spencer	5–23	3–11	8th	
Spencer:		5–23 (.179)	3–11 (.214)		
Vonn Webb (Big West Conference) (2006–2007)
2006–07	Vonn Webb	7–24	1–13	8th	
Webb:		7–24 (.226)	1–13 (.071)		
Jim Wooldridge (Big West Conference) (2007–2014)
2007–08	Jim Wooldridge	9–21	4–12	7th	
2008–09	Jim Wooldridge	17–13	8–8	T–4th	
2009–10	Jim Wooldridge	12–17	5–11	T–9th	
2010–11	Jim Wooldridge	12–19	6–10	T–7th	
2011–12	Jim Wooldridge	14–17	7–9	5th	
2012–13	Jim Wooldridge	6–25	3–15	10th	
Wooldridge:		70–112 (.385)	33–65 (.337)		
Dennis Cutts (Big West Conference) (2013–2018)
2013–14	Dennis Cutts	10–21	5–11	8th	
2014–15	Dennis Cutts	14–17	7–9	6th	
2015–16	Dennis Cutts	14–19	5–11	6th	
2016–17	Dennis Cutts	7–21	5–11	8th	
2017–18	Dennis Cutts	9–22	4–12	7th	
Cutts:		54–100 (.351)	26–54 (.325)		
David Patrick (Big West Conference) (2018–2020)
2018–19	David Patrick	10–23	4–12	8th	
2019–20	David Patrick	17–15	7–9	6th	
Patrick:		27–38 (.415)	11–21 (.344)		
Mike Magpayo (Big West Conference) (2020–present)
2020–21	Mike Magpayo	14–8	8–4	3rd	
2021–22	Mike Magpayo	16–12	9–6	6th	
2022–23	Mike Magpayo	21–11	14–6	3rd	
2023–24	Mike Magpayo	16–18	10–10	T–5th	
2024–25	Mike Magpayo	21–13	14–6	T–3rd	NIT First round
Magpayo:		89–63 (.586)	55–32 (.632)		
Total:		286–433 (.398)			
National champion Postseason invitational champion Conference regular season champion Conference regular season and conference tournament champion Division regular season champion Division regular season and conference tournament champion Conference tournament champion
