= Crawford Hall (Irvine) =

Athletic building at UCI

Coordinates: 33°38′52″N 117°50′53″W

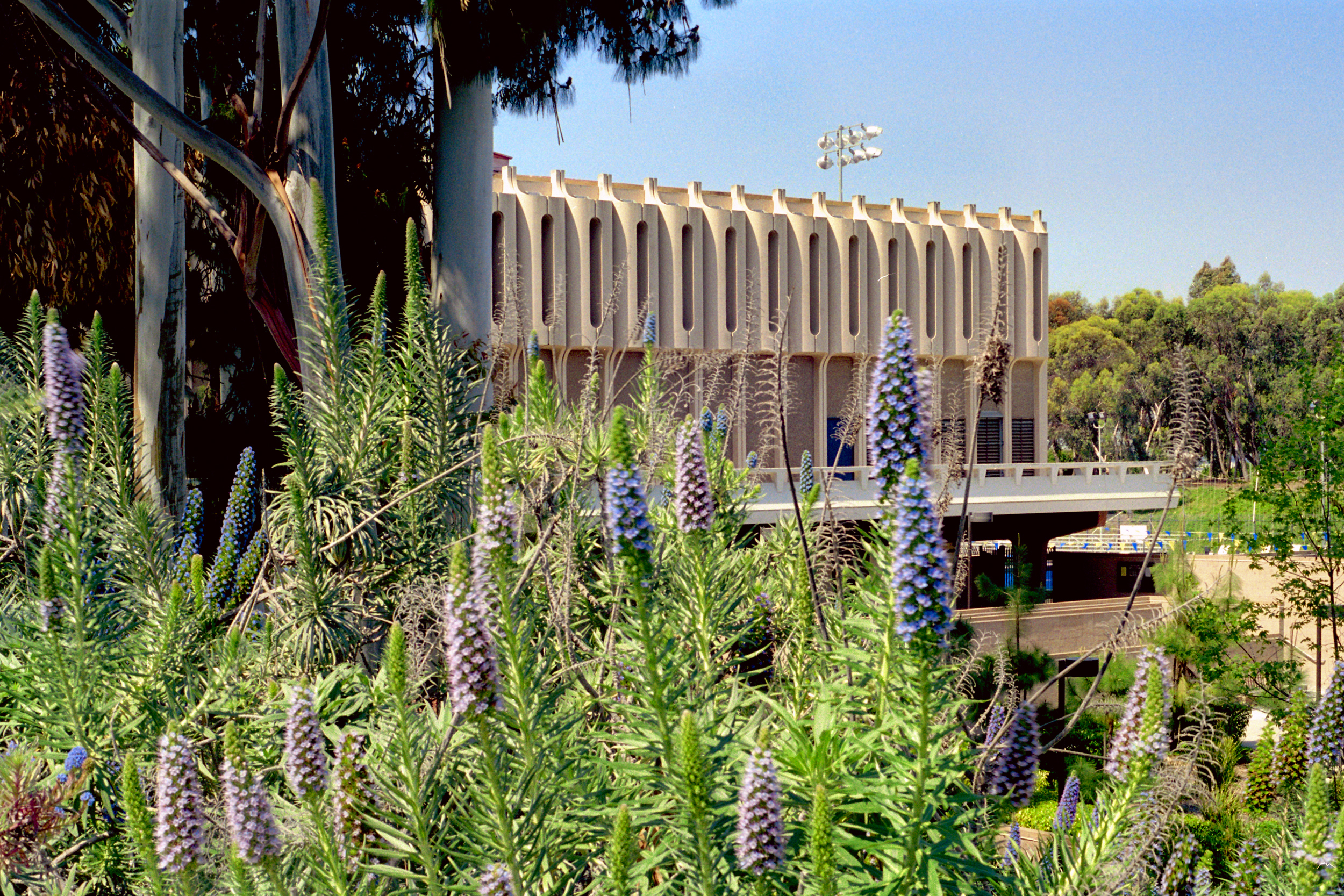
- Interactive map of the Crawford Hall area
- Former names: Campus Hall (1965–1968)

General information
- Architectural style: Futurism
- Location: Irvine, California, United States
- Construction started: 1964
- Completed: 1965
- Client: University of California, Irvine

Technical details
- Structural system: Reinforced concrete

Design and construction
- Architect: William Pereira

Other information
- Seating capacity: 800

Crawford Hall is the basketball and volleyball practice facility for UC Irvine Athletics. Crawford Court located in Crawford Hall is an 800-seat arena that houses the UC Irvine intercollegiate athletics offices, men's basketball, women's basketball, men's volleyball and women's volleyball teams practice facilities.

== Background ==
The Crawford Hall Complex, in addition to housing the athletic administration offices and practice facilities, also includes sports medicine, strength and conditioning, and student-athlete academic support services. The complex includes Crawford Field a set of practice fields for the UC Irvine Anteaters soccer teams. The facility's outdoor breezeway is also informally recognized within the UC Irvine community as the rehearsal space for hip hop dance team Kaba Modern.

== History ==
Crawford Hall is one of nine original buildings designed by William Pereira that were present when the campus opened in 1965. Cased in cylindrical concrete panels and perched atop a small hill, it has a castle-like presence when viewed from the road. It is attached to a smaller administrative building by an arched, covered walkway which spans a landscaped courtyard between the two. Originally named Campus Hall, it served as a multi-purpose facility prior to construction of the first Student Center in the 1980s.

English rock band Led Zeppelin played an 11-song set at Crawford Hall on May 1, 1969.

English band The Cure played an 18-song set at Crawford Hall on October 27, 1984 as part of their "The Top Tour".

American no-wave band Sonic Youth played a 14-song set at Crawford Hall on November 3, 1990 in support of the album Goo

Since 2016, the complex has been used by the Los Angeles Rams during their training camps at UC Irvine.

== See also ==
- Bren Events Center
