= 1967–68 Indiana State Sycamores men's basketball team =

American college basketball season

1967–68 Indiana State Sycamores men's basketball

Indiana Collegiate Conference champions

NCAA Men's Division II tournament, finalist
- Conference: Indiana Collegiate Conference

Ranking
- AP: No. 3 (PreSeason), #9 (Final Poll)
- Record: 23–8 (9–3 ICC)
- Head coach: Gordon Stauffer
- Assistant coaches: Mel Garland; Fred Fleetwood
- Home arena: Indiana State Arena

The 1967–68 Indiana State Sycamores men's basketball team represented Indiana State University during the 1968 NCAA Division II men's basketball tournament. The Sycamores won 19 games in the regular season and were led by Jerry Newsom. He led the Sycamores to the national title game versus a George Tinsley-led Kentucky Wesleyan team, and ended the season as national runner-up with a record of 23–8.

== Regular season ==
During the 1967–68 season, Indiana State finished with a non-conference record of 10–4; they placed 3rd in the Golden Spike Tournament hosted by Weber State (Utah); shared (with DePauw) the championship of the highly competitive Indiana Collegiate Conference (ICC) with a 9–3 record; spent eleven (of fourteen) weeks ranked in the top ten in the country for the season; their streak of 23 consecutive weeks in the AP Top Ten came to an end after dropping 3 out of 4 games in mid-season. They closed out the season by winning 6 consecutive games to win the conference title and qualify for the NCAA tournament; they would eventually stretch their winning streak to 10 games until losing the NCAA title game. The Sycamores finished the regular season with a record of 23–8, 9–3.

Newsom received several honors at the end of regular season. He won the ICC Player of the Year, was named All-ICC for the third time and was a consensus All-American. The co-captain also led the conference in scoring with an average of 27.3; while leading the Trees in scoring in 28 games; he collected 14 double-doubles on the season and led the team in rebounding 17 times.

Newsome was not the only weapon for Stauffer's Sycamores; Rich Mason led the conference in rebounding, grabbing an average of 13 per game and was named 1st Team All-Conference. Mike Copper, the other co-captain was named Honorable Mention All-Conference and Fred Hardman was named to the All-NCAA tournament team.

== Roster ==
The Sycamores were led by Newsom, the ICC Player of the Year, and his 26.1 scoring average. He was followed by Mike Copper's 17.8 average. The starting lineup also included Fred Hardman, Rich Mason and Steve Hollenbeck. Howard Humes and Mike Phillips were key reserves. The remainder of the roster consisted of Dan Chitwood, Ken Hass, John McIntire, Jerry Novak, Jim Waldrip, Don Weirich and Tom Zellers.

No.	Name	Position	Ht.	Year	Hometown
13	Howard Humes	G	6–0	Jr.	Madison, Indiana
20	Don Weirich	F	6–4	So.	Middlebury, Indiana
22	Rod Hervey	G	5–11	So.	Cloverdale, Indiana
30	John McIntire	F	6–4	So.	Rushville, Indiana
33	Mike Copper	G	6–1	Jr.	Valparaiso, Indiana
34	Dan Chitwood	G	6–3	So.	Unionville, Indiana
35	Fred Hardman	F	6–6	Jr.	Lexington, Illinois
40	Tom Zellers	F	6–3	So.	Logansport, Indiana
41	Jerry Newsom	C	6–C	Sr.	Columbus, Indiana
43	Ken Hass	F	6–6	Jr.	South Bend, Indiana
44	Jerry Novak	F	6–6	Jr.	Hammond, Indiana
45	Steve Hollenbeck	G	6–1	Sr.	Columbus, Indiana
51	Mike Phillips	F	6–3	Sr.	Terre Haute, Indiana
52	Rich Mason	F	6–8	Sr.	East Chicago, Indiana
54	Jim Waldrip	F	6–3	So.	Cumberland, Illinois

== Schedule and results ==
Date time, TV	Rank^{#}	Opponent^{#}	Result	Record	Site city, state
Regular season
December 2, 1967*		at Cincinnati	L 79-83	0-1	Armory Fieldhouse; Cincinnati, Ohio
December 5, 1967*		at Indiana Central	W 84-73	1-1	Central College Gym; Indianapolis, Indiana
December 7, 1967*	No. 3	at No. 2 Kentucky Wesleyan	L 61-62	1-2	The Arena; Terre Haute, Indiana
December 9, 1967*	No. 3	Kent State	W 91-66	2-2	The Arena; Terre Haute, Indiana
December 11, 1967*	No. 3	Lamar Tech	W 105-93	3-2	The Arena; Terre Haute, Indiana
December 14, 1967*	No. 7	at Purdue	L 71-90	3-3	Mackey Arena; West Lafayette, Indiana
December 16, 1967*	No. 7	Western Illinois	W 86-72	4-3	The Arena; Terre Haute, Indiana
December 19, 1967*	No. 7	No. 1 San Diego State	W 84-69	5-3	The Arena; Terre Haute, Indiana
December 21, 1967*	No. 6	No. 3 Southwest Louisiana	W 63-60	6-3	The Arena; Terre Haute, Indiana
December 27, 1967*	No. 6	at Weber State; Golden Spike Tournament	L 66-71	6-4	Swenson Gym; Ogden, Utah
December 28, 1967*	No. 3	vs. Pepperdine; Golden Spike Tournament	W 88-81	7-4	Swenson Gym; Ogden, Utah
January 4, 1968	No. T-5	DePauw	W 86-66	8-4 (1-0)	The Arena; Terre Haute, Indiana
January 6, 1968*	No. T-5	Southern Illinois	W 78-60	9-4 (1-0)	The Arena; Terre Haute, Indiana
January 8, 1968	No. T-5	at Valparaiso	W 71-70	10-4 (2-0)	Hilltop Gymnasium; Valparaiso, Indiana
January 10, 1968	No. T-5	Indiana State_Muncee	W 94-81	11-4 (3-0)	The Arena; Terre Haute, Indiana
January 13, 1968	No. 4	St. Joseph’s (IN)	W 75-59	12-4 (4-0)	The Arena; Terre Haute, Indiana
January 16, 1968	No. 4	at Butler	L 85-86	12-5 (4-1)	Butler Fieldhouse; Indianapolis, Indiana
January 27, 1968	No. 6	at Indiana State_Muncee	W 96-81	13-5 (5-1)	Irving Gymnasium; Muncee, Indiana
January 31, 1968	No. 6	No. 2 Evansville College	L 78-84	13-6 (5-2)	The Arena; Terre Haute, Indiana
February 3, 1968	No. 6	at DePauw	L 84-98	13-7 (5-3)	Bowman Gym; Greencastle, Indiana
February 7, 1968	No. 6	Northern Illinois	W 95-84	14-7 (5-3)	The Arena; Terre Haute, Indiana
February 10, 1968		Valparaiso	W 97-60	15-7 (6-3)	The Arena; Terre Haute, Indiana
February 12, 1968*		at Eastern Illinois State	W 100-71	16-7 (6-3)	McAfee Gym; Charleston, Illinois
February 14, 1968		at St. Joseph’s (IN)	W 96-75	17-7 (7-3)	Scharf Fieldhouse; Rensselaer, Indiana
February 17, 1968		at No. 3 Evansville	W 68-58	18-7 (8-3)	Roberts Municipal Stadium; Evansville, Indiana
February 20, 1968		Butler	W 83-55	19-7 (9-3)	The Arena; Terre Haute, Indiana
March 8, 1968*	(1 Great Lakes) No. 9	vs. (4) South Dakota State; Great Lakes Regional semifinals	W 101-96	20-7 (9-3)	Horton Fieldhouse; Normal, Illinois
March 9, 1968*	(1 Great Lakes) No. 9	vs. (2 Great Lakes) No. 4 Illinois State; Great Lakes Regional finals	W 98-93	21-7 (9-3)	Horton Fieldhouse; Normal, Illinois
March 13, 1968*	(1 Great Lakes) No. 9	vs. (2 Pacific) Nevada Southern; NCAA Nationals – Quarterfinals	W 94-75	22-7 (9-3)	Roberts Municipal Stadium; Evansville, Indiana
March 14, 1968*	(1 Great Lakes) No. 9	vs. (3 Southwest) No. 10 Trinity (TX); NCAA Nationals – Semifinals	W 77-67	23-7 (9-3)	Roberts Municipal Stadium; Evansville, Indiana
March 15, 1968*	(1 Great Lakes) No. 9	vs. (1 South) No. 2 Kentucky Wesleyan; NCAA Nationals – Title game	L 52-63	23-8 (9-3)	Roberts Municipal Stadium; Evansville, Indiana
*Non-conference game. ^{#}Rankings from AP Poll. (#) Tournament seedings in parentheses.

== NCAA basketball tournament ==
The top seed in the NCAA Great Lakes Regional was awarded to the Sycamores. In the opener, the Trees sprinted past #4 seed South Dakota State, the final game of the regional tournament was against heated-rival & #2 seed Illinois State with a berth in the Final Four on the line. The Sycamores won by 5, and returned to a National Tournament Finals for the first time in 15 seasons (1953 NAIA Tournament).

In Evansville, site of the NCAA Finals, the Sycamores dominated the Rebels of Nevada Southern, winning by 19; they cruised past Trinity of Texas advancing to the Championship game vs. Kentucky Wesleyan College, which was led by junior George Tinsley. Playing in a standing room only arena, they were unable to maintain their halftime lead and Kentucky Wesleyan defeated Indiana State 63–52. Newsom was voted Most Outstanding Player of the Final Four. Fred Hardman was also named to the All-Tourney team after posting a 16-point, 9-rebound title game.

- Elite Eight
  - Indiana State 94, Nevada Southern 75
- National Semi-Finals
  - Indiana State 77, Trinity (TX) 67
- National Championship Game
  - Kentucky Wesleyan 63, Indiana State 52

== Awards and honors ==
- Mike Copper – All-Indiana Collegiate Conference (Honorable Mention)
- Fred Hardman – NCAA Tournament All-Tourney Team
- Rich Mason – All-Indiana Collegiate Conference (First Team)
- Jerry Newsom – Consensus All-American (AP, UPI, and Coaches)
- Jerry Newsom – Indiana Collegiate Conference Most Valuable Player
- Jerry Newsom – All-Indiana Collegiate Conference (First Team)
- Jerry Newsom – NCAA Tournament Most Outstanding Player Award; NCAA Tournament All-Tourney Team

In 2005, the entire team was inducted into the Indiana State University Athletic Hall of Fame; Jerry Newsom was inducted as an individual in 1984.

Jerry Newsom (1997), Head Coach Gordon Stauffer (2004), Assistant Coach Mel Garland (1993) Steve Hollenbeck (2005) and Mike Copper (2010) were inducted into the Indiana Basketball Hall of Fame.
