= List of Drexel Dragons men's basketball head coaches =

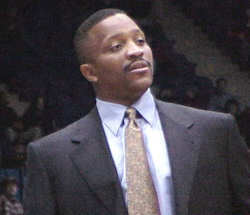
Bruiser Flint held the head coach position from the 2001 season through the 2015 season.

The men's college basketball program of the Drexel University was founded in 1894 and is known competitively as the Drexel Dragons. The team has had 26 head coaches in its history, and they have made 5 appearances in the NCAA Men's Division I Basketball Championship, including a first round victory in 1996. Samuel Cozen won 213 career games as head coach between 1952 and 1968, the second most in the school's history behind Bruiser Flint.

In 2013, Bruiser Flint won his 214th regular season game as the Dragon's head coach, achieving in the program's history the distinction of its winningest head coach.

== Coaches ==
Years	Duration of head coaching career at Drexel
Won	Number of games won at Drexel
Lost	Number of games lost at Drexel
%	Percentage of games won at Drexel
*	Elected to the Naismith Memorial Basketball Hall of Fame as a coach

Statistics updated through 2025–26 season

Head Coach	Years	Won	Lost	%
John Gray	1894–1895	7	2	.778
F. Knight	1895–1896	0	1	.000
No team	1896–1900	0	0	–
No coach	1900–1905	5	15	.250
Walter S. Brokaw	1905-1907	21	7	.750
F. Bennett	1908-1908	7	10	.412
G. Doughty	1908-1909	1	2	.333
No coach	1909-1910	2	7	.222
Frank Griffin	1910–1913	15	15	.500
No coach	1913–1914	2	0	1.000
E.L. Lucas	1914-1917	15	14	.517
No coach	1917–1918	0	2	.000
James Barrett	1918-1920	12	10	.545
William McAvoy	1920-1922	12	14	.462
Harvey O'Brien	1922-1925	16	21	.432
Ernest Lange	1925-1927	11	19	.367
Walter Halas	1927–1934	52	78	.400
Ernest Lange	1934–1940	30	63	.323
Lawrence Mains	1940-1943	26	17	.605
Maury McMains	1943-1944	3	2	.600
John Marino	1944–1945	2	11	.154
John McNally	1945-1946	2	14	.125
Ralph Chase	1946-1949	26	26	.500
Harold Kollar	1949-1952	25	27	.481
Samuel Cozen	1952-1968	213	94	.694
Robert Morgan	1967-1968	2	7	.222
Frank Szymanski	1968–1971	26	39	.400
Ray Haesler	1971–1977	80	60	.571
Eddie Burke	1977-1991	205	189	.520
Bill Herrion	1991–1999	167	71	.702
Steve Seymour	1999–2001	28	29	.491
Bruiser Flint	2001–2016	245	217	.530
Zach Spiker	2016–Present	148	161	.479
TOTAL	129 Seasons	1,406	1,244	.531
