= 1962–63 Drexel Dragons men's basketball team =

American college basketball season

1962–63 Drexel Dragons men's basketball

MAC College–Southern Regular Season Champions
- Conference: Middle Atlantic Conferences
- College–Southern
- Record: 18–5 (13–2 MAC)
- Head coach: Samuel Cozen (11th season)
- Assistant coach: Bob Morgan
- Home arena: Sayre High School

The 1962–63 Drexel Dragons men's basketball team represented Drexel Institute of Technology during the 1962–63 men's basketball season. The Dragons, led by 11th year head coach Samuel Cozen, played their home games at Sayre High School and were members of the college–Southern division of the Middle Atlantic Conferences (MAC).

Drexel finished the regular season as the MAC College–Southern division champions and lost to Susquehanna in the first round of the MAC tournament.

== Roster ==
1962–63 Drexel Dragons men's basketball team
Players
Coaches

Pos.	#	Name	Height	Weight	Year	Previous school	Hometown
G	44	Mike McCurdy	—	—	So
G	35	Chuck King	—	—
G	21	George Schaeffer	—	—
F	14	Pete Zimmerman	—	—	Sr
G	23	Ted Sitek	—	—
G	17	Dave Lee	—	—
G	42	Allen Gart	—	—
F	11	Bob Molluro	—	—
F		Dick Earley	—	—
F		Jerry Whiteman	—	—
F		Bob Pursell	—	—

Head coach

- Samuel Cozen (Temple)

Assistant coach(es)

- Bob Morgan

Legend

- (C) Team captain
- (S) Suspended
- (I) Ineligible
- (W) Walk-on
- Injured
- Current redshirt

== Schedule ==
Date time, TV	Rank^{#}	Opponent^{#}	Result	Record	High points	High rebounds	High assists	Site (attendance) city, state
Regular season
December 1, 1962*		at Delaware Valley	W 65–39	1–0	14 – King	–	–	Doylestown, PA
December 15, 1962; 3:00 pm		Delaware	L 51–63	1–1 (0–1)	–	–	–	Sayre High School; Philadelphia, PA
December 18, 1962; 8:00 pm		Swarthmore	W 74–38	2–1 (1–1)	17 – King	–	–	Sayre High School; Philadelphia, PA
December 27, 1962*		vs. Illinois Tech; Rochester Technical College Tournament Quarterfinals	W 60–55	3–1	–	–	–	Rochester, NY
December 28, 1962*		vs. Indiana Tech; Rochester Technical College Tournament Semifinals	W 68–53	4–1	24 – King	–	–	Rochester, NY
December 29, 1962*		vs. Lawrence Tech; Rochester Technical College Tournament Championship	W 63–53	5–1	–	–	–	Rochester, NY
January 3, 1963		vs. Pennsylvania Military College	L 46–47	5–2 (2–1)	14 – McCurdy	–	–	Palestra; Philadelphia, PA
January 9, 1963		vs. Haverford	W 61–38	6–2 (3–1)	16 – McCurdy	–	–	Palestra; Philadelphia, PA
January 12, 1963*		Wagner	W 77–76	7–2	19 – McCurdy	–	–	Sayre High School; Philadelphia, PA
January 14, 1963		at Ursinus	W 66–47	8–2 (4–1)	16 – Zimmerman	–	–	Collegeville, PA
January 16, 1963		at Elizabethtown	L 59–86	8–3 (4–2)	15 – McCurdy	–	–	Elizabethtown, PA
January 19, 1963; 3:30 pm		Washington (MD)	W 79–60	9–3 (5–2)	21 – McCurdy	–	–	Sayre High School; Philadelphia, PA
January 26, 1963; 1:30 pm		at Upsala	W 70–52	10–3 (6–2)	22 – McCurdy	15 – Zimmerman	–	East Orange, NJ
February 2, 1963; 3:30 pm		Franklin & Marshall	W 39–31	11–3 (7–2)	12 – McCurdy	–	–	Sayre High School; Philadelphia, PA
February 4, 1963; 8:45 pm		at Johns Hopkins	W 46–41	12–3 (8–2)	13 – King	11 – Zimmerman	–	
February 6, 1963; 8:30 pm		at Swarthmore	W 66–47	13–3 (9–2)	19 – McCurdy	–	8 – Schaeffer	
February 9, 1963; 3:00 pm		at Pennsylvania Military College	W 58–48	14–3 (10–2)	19 – King	–	–	
February 13, 1963; 8:15 pm		at Haverford	W 59–41	15–3 (11–2)	19 – King	–	–	Ryan Gym; Haverford, PA
February 15, 1963*; 9:15 pm		vs. Rider	L 69–79	15–4	–	–	–	Palestra; Philadelphia, PA
February 16, 1963; 3:30 pm		at Lycoming	W 71–59	16–4 (12–2)	–	–	–	
February 23, 1963		Ursinus	W 69–53	17–4 (13–2)	20 – McCurdy	–	–	Sayre High School; Philadelphia, PA
1963 Middle Atlantic Conference men's basketball tournament
March 1, 1963; 9:00 pm		vs. Susquehanna; Semifinals	L 62–64	17–5	19 – King	–	–	Muhlenberg Memorial Hall; Allentown, PA
March 2, 1963; 7:00 pm		vs. Haverford; Third Place Game	W 61–56	18–5	18 – King	16 – Zimmerman	–	Muhlenberg Memorial Hall; Allentown, PA
*Non-conference game. ^{#}Rankings from AP. (#) Tournament seedings in parentheses. All times are in Eastern Time.
