= T. L. Plain =

American basketball coach (1925–2020)

Truman Layton "TL" Plain
Biographical details
- Born: March 30, 1925; Sacramento, Kentucky, U.S.
- Died: August 10, 2020; Henderson, Kentucky, U.S.

Coaching career (HC unless noted)
- 1949–1953: Breckinridge County HS
- 1953–1957: Henderson City HS
- 1957–1959: Vincennes Lincoln HS
- 1959–1963: Kentucky Wesleyan
- 1964–1967: Vincennes Lincoln HS
- 1967–1969: Louisville (assistant)
- 1969–1971: Kentucky (assistant)
- 1971–1973: Utah State

Head coaching record
- Overall: 91–58 (college)
- Tournaments: 5–2 (NCAA College Division)

Truman Layton "T. L." Plain was an American basketball coach. Plain graduated from Western Kentucky State Teachers College in 1950, and received his master's degree from Murray State. Plain coached various high school basketball and baseball teams in Western Kentucky and Southern Indiana in the 1950s and 1960s From 1959 to 1963 T.L. Plain was the coach of the Kentucky Wesleyan Panthers where he coached the team to two NCAA Division II Tournaments. After two years of assistant coaching at University of Louisville Plain became an assistant coach for the University of Kentucky under coach Adolph Rupp. While at Kentucky, he was a part of the 1970 NCAA Runner up team. When Rupp was forced to retire by state law, the choice was down to Joe B. Hall and Plain for the head coaching position. T. L. Plain get the chance at a Division I school with Utah State University. His post coaching career included coordinator of convention sales at the Executive Inn in Evansville, Indiana. Since 2005 he resided in Owensboro, Kentucky

== Head coaching record ==
=== College ===
Record table
Season	Team	Overall	Conference	Standing	Postseason
Kentucky Wesleyan Panthers (NCAA College Division independent) (1959–1963)
1959–60	Kentucky Wesleyan	18–11			NCAA College Division Third Place
1960–61	Kentucky Wesleyan	15–8			NCAA College Division Regional Third Place
1961–62	Kentucky Wesleyan	21–4			
1962–63	Kentucky Wesleyan	9–11			
Kentucky Wesleyan:		63–34			
Utah State Aggies (NCAA University Division independent) (1971–1973)
1971–72	Utah State	12–14			
1972–73	Utah State	16–10			
Utah State:		28–24			
Total:		91–58			
