= Dallas Thornton =

American basketball player

Personal information
- Born: September 1, 1946 (age 80) Louisville, Kentucky, U.S.
- Listed height: 6 ft 4 in (1.93 m)
- Listed weight: 190 lb (86 kg)

Career information
- High school: Male (Louisville, Kentucky)
- College: Kentucky Wesleyan (1964–1968)
- NBA draft: 1968: 4th round, 40th overall pick
- Drafted by: Baltimore Bullets
- Position: Small forward
- Number: 34

Career history
- 1968–1969: Miami Floridians

Career highlights
- 2× NCAA College Division champion (1966, 1968); 2× NCAA College Division All-American (1967, 1968); No. 22 retired by Kentucky Wesleyan Panthers
- Stats at Basketball Reference

Dallas Thornton (born September 1, 1946) is an American former basketball player.

== Biography ==
Thornton was born in Louisville, Kentucky and played basketball at Male High School there.

Thornton played college basketball at Kentucky Wesleyan College.

Thornton was selected in the 1968 NBA draft in the fourth round by the Baltimore Bullets and was selected in the 1968 ABA draft by the Miami Floridians. Thornton opted to sign with the Floridians and played for the team through two seasons, averaging 6.6 points per game in the 1968–69 season and 8.8 points per game in 1969–70.

Thornton then played for the Harlem Globetrotters and appeared in the 1981 movie The Harlem Globetrotters on Gilligan's Island.
