= Gordon C. Stauffer =

American basketball player and coach (1930–2019)

Biographical details
- Born: May 21, 1930; Fort Wayne, Indiana, U.S.
- Died: September 23, 2019 (aged 89); Sanford, Florida, U.S.

Playing career
- 1948–1952: Michigan State
- Position: Guard

Coaching career (HC unless noted)
- 1959–1962: South Carolina (assistant)
- 1962–1966: Oklahoma (assistant)
- 1966–1967: Washburn
- 1967–1975: Indiana State
- 1975–1979: Purdue Fort Wayne
- 1979–1981: Geneva
- 1981–1990: Nicholls State

Head coaching record
- Overall: 299–331

Accomplishments and honors

Championships
- NCAA Great Lakes Regional (1968); Indiana Collegiate Conference (1968); Central Intercollegiate Conference (1967)

Awards
- Indiana Basketball Hall of Fame (2004)

Gordon C. Stauffer (May 21, 1930 – September 23, 2019) was an American college basketball coach. He was the head men's basketball coach at Indiana State University; leading their transition from NCAA College Division (now Division II) to Division I and membership in the Midwestern Conference and ultimately the Missouri Valley Conference.

Stauffer also coached at Washburn University, Indiana University–Purdue University Fort Wayne (IPFW), at Geneva College, and his last college position was at Nicholls State, where he coached the Colonels from 1981 to 1990, again leading the school through a transition period from Division II to Division I.

== Playing career ==
A Fort Wayne, Indiana South High star, led the Archers to Sectional and Regional titles in his Junior season (1947); he was tabbed 'Honorable Mention All-State' and attended Michigan State on a basketball scholarship. While at Michigan State, he was a member of their first Big Ten Conference team, and was the second-leading scorer in 1952. He lettered three seasons for the Spartans. He was coached by two coaches, most notably Hall-of-Famer Pete Newell.

Stauffer was drafted in the 1952 NBA draft by the Indianapolis Olympians. While he was the first Michigan State player ever picked in an NBA draft, he never played for the Olympians.

== Coaching career ==
To begin his coaching career, Stauffer moved into the high school coaching ranks in his home state of Indiana, where he coached the Royerton Redbirds from 1955 to 1959. He left Royerton to move into the college coaching ranks at the University of South Carolina, where he assisted Walt Hambrick and Bob Stevens; he then moved to the University of Oklahoma with Bob Stevens as the top assistant.

He got his first head coaching job with Washburn University; after a winning season in his first year, he moved up the ranks to Indiana State. After eight seasons in Terre Haute at Indiana State, he took the head job at Indiana University–Purdue University Fort Wayne. He then spent two seasons at Geneva College, leading them to the NCCAA playoffs in each season. After Geneva College, Stauffer spent nine seasons at Nicholls State before retiring to Florida.

== Personal life ==
Stauffer died on September 23, 2019, at age 89.

Stauffer was preceded by his son in death. He left behind his two daughters, his wife, and four grandchildren.

== Head coaching record ==
Record table
Season	Team	Overall	Conference	Standing	Postseason
Washburn (Central Intercollegiate Athletic Conference) (1966–1967)
1966–67	Washburn	15–6	6–2	T–1st	
Washburn:		15–6 (.714)	6–2 (.750)		
Indiana State (Indiana Collegiate Conference) (1967–1968)
1967–68	Indiana State	23–8	9–3	T–1st	NCAA College Division Runner-up
Indiana State (NCAA D-II Independent) (1968–1970)
1968–69	Indiana State	13–13			
1969–70	Indiana State	16–10			
Indiana State (Midwestern Conference) (1970–1972)
1970–71	Indiana State	17–9	5–3	2nd	
1971–72	Indiana State	12–14	4–4	3rd	
Indiana State (NCAA D-I Independent) (1972–1975)
1972–73	Indiana State	16–10			
1973–74	Indiana State	12–14			
1974–75	Indiana State	12–14			
Indiana State:		121–90 (.573)	18–10 (.643)		
Purdue Fort Wayne (NCAA D-III Independent) (1975–1979)
1975–76	Purdue-Fort Wayne	15–12			
1976–77	Purdue-Fort Wayne	8–19			
1977–78	Purdue-Fort Wayne	8–16			
1978–79	Purdue-Fort Wayne	6–21			
Purdue-Fort Wayne:		37–68 (.352)			
Geneva (NAIA) (1979–1981)
1979–80	Geneva	15–12			NCCAA
1980–81	Geneva	10–16			NCCAA
Geneva:		25–28 (.472)			
Nicholls State (NCAA D-I Independent) (1981–1984)
1981–82	Nicholls State	6–20			
Nicholls State (Trans America Athletic Conference) (1982–1984)
1982–83	Nicholls State	16–12			Ineligible for TAAC title
1983–84	Nicholls State	19–7			Ineligible for TAAC title
Nicholls State (Gulf Star Conference) (1984–1987)
1984–85	Nicholls State	17–10	6–4		
1985–86	Nicholls State	8–16	2–8		
1986–87	Nicholls State	9–18	1–9		
Nicholls State (NCAA D-I Independent) (1987–1990)
1987–88	Nicholls State	10–18			
1988–89	Nicholls State	12–16			
1989–90	Nicholls State	4–23			
Nicholls State:		101–140 (.419)	9–21 (.300)		
Total:		299–331 (.475)			
National champion Postseason invitational champion Conference regular season champion Conference regular season and conference tournament champion Division regular season champion Division regular season and conference tournament champion Conference tournament champion
