= Middle Atlantic Conference men's basketball tournaments =

Middle Atlantic Conferences men's basketball tournaments
- Conference basketball championship
- Sport: Basketball
- Conference: Middle Atlantic Conferences
- Format: Single-elimination tournament
- Played: 1947–present
- Current champion: Commonwealth: Hood (2nd); Freedom: Stevens (4th)
- Most championships: Scranton (16)
- Official website: MAC men's basketball

The Middle Atlantic Conferences men's basketball tournaments are the annual conference basketball championship tournaments for the NCAA Division III Middle Atlantic Conferences: the MAC Commonwealth and MAC Freedom.

The MAC has held a tournament more or less every year since 1947, although the current two-conference format has only been played since 2001. They are each a single-elimination tournament and seeding is based on regular season records.

The winners, each declared champion of their respective conference, receives one of the MAC's two automatic bids to the NCAA Division III men's basketball tournament.

== College Division/Division III results ==
=== Middle Atlantic Conference (1947–49) ===
Year	Champions	Score	Runner-up
1947	Muhlenberg	45–41	La Salle
1948	Muhlenberg	63–52	Moravian
1949	Albright	64–51	Gettysburg

- No tournament held between 1950 and 1957

=== MAC College Division (1958–66) ===
Year	Champions	Score	Runner-up
1958	Wagner	70–64	Franklin & Marshall
1959	Hofstra	70–64	Drexel
1960	Drexel	70–53	Wagner
1961	Albright	45–44	Hofstra
1962	Hofstra	72–47	Albright
1963	Hofstra	65–50	Susquehanna
1964	Elizabethtown	59–52	Drexel
1965	Albright	70–56	Dickinson
1966	Albright	58–45	Drexel

- No tournament held in 1967

=== MAC Northern Division (1968–93) ===
Year	Champions	Score	Runner-up
1968	Wagner	90–70	Lycoming
1969	Scranton	63–61	Juniata
1970	Philadelphia Textile	103–83	Scranton
1971	Philadelphia Textile	74–54	Upsala
1972	Philadelphia Textile	85–62	Albright
1973	Philadelphia Textile	98–55	Scranton
1974	Albright	83–63	Lycoming
1975	Scranton	49–46	Upsala
1976	Scranton	90–64	Upsala
1977	Albright	50–49	Scranton
1978	Scranton	52–50	Lycoming
1979	Elizabethtown	45–41	Albright
1980	Scranton	87–75	Albright
1981	Scranton	68–63	Albright
1982	Scranton	69–59	Susquehanna
1983	Scranton	57–51	FDU–Florham
1984	Scranton	74–66	King's (PA)
1985	Scranton	56–50	Lycoming
1986	Susquehanna	52–59	Scranton
1987	Scranton	81–68	Elizabethtown
1988	Scranton	66–65	FDU–Florham
1989	Susquehanna	78–71	Scranton
1990	King's (PA)	68–64	FDU–Florham
1991	Scranton	75–69	King's (PA)
1992	Susquehanna	78–73 (OT)	Albright
1993	Scranton	69–44	Susquehanna

=== MAC Southern Division (1968–93) ===
Year	Champions	Score	Runner-up
1968	Muhlenberg	70–57	Ursinus
1969	Muhlenberg	80–76	Pennsylvania Military
1970	Muhlenberg	70–68	Pennsylvania Military
1971	Lebanon Valley	100–68	Johns Hopkins
1972	Pennsylvania Military	68–62	Lebanon Valley
1973	Lebanon Valley	61–59	Widener
1974	Johns Hopkins	80–74 (OT)	Muhlenberg
1975	Franklin & Marshall	53–47	Haverford
1976	Widener	51–40	Franklin & Marshall
1977	Widener	89–44	Haverford
1978	Widener	54–49	Gettysburg
1979	Franklin & Marshall	53–47	Widener
1980	Dickinson	65–62 (OT)	Ursinus
1981	Franklin & Marshall	65–54	Dickinson
1982	Widener	50–44	Ursinus
1983	Widener	64–56	Dickinson
1984	Franklin & Marshall	38–37	Widener
1985	Widener	53–41	Muhlenberg
1986	Franklin & Marshall	72–62	Susquehanna
1987	Widener	77–60	Franklin & Marshall
1988	Franklin & Marshall	75–68	Moravian
1989	Franklin & Marshall	71–64	Johns Hopkins
1990	Franklin & Marshall	87–77	Washington (MD)
1991	Johns Hopkins	82–80 (OT)	Swarthmore
1992	Franklin & Marshall	60–59	Johns Hopkins
1993	Franklin & Marshall	68–48	Lebanon Valley

=== Middle Atlantic Conference (1994–2000) ===
Year	Champions	Score	Runner-up
1994	Lebanon Valley	79–60	Upsala
1995	Lebanon Valley	61–56	Wilkes
1996	Wilkes	71–49	Susquehanna
1997	Widener	61–59	Lebanon Valley
1998	Wilkes	83–75	Scranton
1999	Wilkes	66–51	Lebanon Valley
2000	Widener	81–71	Scranton

=== MAC Commonwealth (2001–present) ===
Year	Champions	Score	Runner-up
2001	Widener	81–74	Elizabethtown
2002	Elizabethtown	85–73	Widener
2003	Elizabethtown	85–73	Widener
2004	Elizabethtown	61–54	Widener
2005	Albright	81–68	Lebanon Valley
2006	Messiah	56–55	Widener
2007	Widener	63–60	Juniata
2008	Widener	75–61	Lycoming
2009	Widener	67–65	Elizabethtown
2010	Albright	87–74	Lycoming
2011	Alvernia	57–55	Lebanon Valley
2012	Messiah	68–59	Lycoming
2013	Alvernia	78–68	Lycoming
2014	Alvernia	70–69	Stevenson
2015	Alvernia	58–51	Stevenson
2016	Lycoming	78–73	Arcadia
2017	Lyoming	76–62	Albright
2018	Lebanon Valley	70–68	Albright
2019	Arcadia	92–56	Widener
2020	Lycoming	68–64	Arcadia
2021	Albright	82–77	Lebanon Valley
2022	Hood	75–71	Eastern
2023	Widener	74–69	Alvernia
2024	Eastern	98–69	Widener
2025	York (PA)	82–67	Alvernia
2026	Hood	103–98 (2OT)	York (PA)

=== MAC Freedom (2001–present) ===
Year	Champions	Score	Runner-up
2001	Wilkes	86–81	Scranton
2002	Lycoming	71–64	King's (PA)
2003	Scranton	72–65	DeSales
2004	Lycoming	78–70	Wilkes
2005	King's (PA)	77–72	DeSales
2006	Scranton	64–63	Wilkes
2007	King's (PA)	67–64	DeSales
2008	King's (PA)	71–62	DeSales
2009	DeSales	72–58	Manhattanville
2010	DeSales	69–61	Misericordia
2011	Delaware Valley	79–58	DeSales
2012	Misericodia	65–46	Wilkes
2013	Delaware Valley	77–72	DeSales
2014	DeSales	73–64 (OT)	Misericordia
2015	Misericordia	83–67	Delaware Valley
2016	Delaware Valley	75–72	Wilkes
2017	Misericordia	78–75	DeSales
2018	Misericordia	74–59	DeSales
2019	DeSales	78–66	Wilkes
2020	Stevens	77–59	Eastern
2021	Lycoming	69–53	DeSales
2022	Stevens	71–68	Lycoming
2023	Arcadia	74–61	DeSales
2024	Stevens	54–53	DeSales
2025	Delaware Valley	64–63	Stevens
2026	Stevens	68–59	Misericordia

== Championship records ==
=== College Division/Division III ===
School	Finals Record	Finals Appearances	Years
Scranton	16–8	24	1969, 1975, 1976, 1978, 1980, 1981, 1982, 1983, 1984, 1985, 1987, 1988, 1991, 1993, 2003, 2006
Widener (Pennsylvania Military)	15–11	26	1972, 1976, 1977, 1978, 1982, 1983, 1985, 1987, 1997, 2000, 2001, 2007, 2008, 2009, 2023
Franklin & Marshall	10–3	13	1975, 1979, 1981, 1984, 1986, 1988, 1989, 1990, 1992, 1993
Albright	9–8	17	1949, 1961, 1965, 1966, 1974, 1977, 2005, 2010, 2021
Lycoming	6–5	11	2002, 2004, 2016, 2017, 2020, 2021
Lebanon Valley	5–5	10	1971, 1973, 1994, 1995, 2018
Elizabethtown	5–1	6	1964, 1979, 2002, 2003, 2004
Muhlenberg	5–2	7	1947, 1948, 1968, 1969, 1970
DeSales	4–12	16	2009, 2010, 2014, 2019
Wilkes	4–6	10	1996, 1998, 1999, 2001
Misericordia	4–3	7	2012, 2015, 2017, 2018
King's (PA)	4–3	7	1990, 2005, 2007, 2008
Alvernia	4–2	6	2011, 2013, 2014, 2015
Stevens	4–1	5	2020, 2022, 2024, 2026
Delaware Valley	4–1	5	2011, 2013, 2016, 2025
Jefferson (Philadelphia Textile)	4–0	4	1970, 1971, 1972, 1973
Susquehanna	3–5	8	1986, 1989, 1992
Hofstra	3–1	4	1959, 1962, 1963
Johns Hopkins	2–3	5	1974, 1991
Arcadia	2–1	3	2019, 2023
Wagner	2–1	3	1958, 1968
Hood	2–0	2	2022, 2026
Messiah	2–0	2	2006, 2012
Dickinson	1–3	4	1980
Drexel	1–3	4	1960
Eastern	1–2	2	2024
York (PA)	1–1	2	2025
Upsala	0–4	4	
FDU–Florham	0–3	3	
Ursinus	0–3	3	
Gettysburg	0–2	2	
Haverford	0–2	2	
Juniata	0–2	2	
Moravian	0–2	2	
Stevenson	0–2	2	
La Salle	0–1	1	
Manhattanville	0–1	1	
Swarthmore	0–1	1	
Washington (MD)	0–1	1	

- Schools highlighted in pink are former members of the MAC as of the next NCAA basketball season in 2024–25.
