= History of Le Moyne Dolphins men's basketball (1958–1960) =

NCAA Division I men's basketball team representing Le Moyne College

The history of Le Moyne Dolphins men's basketball from 1958 to 1960 includes the Dolphins' first two appearances in the NCCA tournament. Led by Dick Lynch, Bob Hollembaek and Chuck Sammons, Le Moyne won a share of the 1959 Middle Eastern College Athletic Association (MECAA) championship, the first conference title in program history and earned the first of what would be seven NCAA tournament bids over a span of 11 seasons. Lynch, John Caveny and Bill Stanley led the Dolphins to the outright MECAA championship in 1960, and a second consecutive tournament berth. Head coach Tommy Niland was named MECAA coach of the year for both 1959 and 1960. The Dolphins were 18–6 in 1958–59, reaching the Sweet 16 of the 1959 tournament, and 13–5 in 1959–60, finishing fourth in their region in the 1960 tournament. Lynch was named first-team all-MECAA in both seasons.

== First NCAA tournament bid (1958–1959) ==
The 1958–59 season marked the start of a golden era for Le Moyne Dolphins basketball. They appeared in seven of the 11 NCAA College Division tournaments between 1959 and 1969, reaching the Sweet 16 in 1959 and 1964.

During the preseason in the fall of 1958, the outlook was less than rosy. Although Le Moyne's leading scorer, Dick Lynch, was returning for his junior season, the team was thought to be undersized and lacking enough rebounding and depth to be competitive. Captain Frank Bergen, top rebounder John Young and Ed Czajka all graduated. John Dobbertin, Dick Nendza and Dennis Morrissey returned for their senior seasons, and Bob Scarborough, who missed a season due to academic ineligibility, returned as a redshirt senior. In addition to Lynch, other returning juniors were George Woyciesjes, Bill Young and John Finnegan. Bob Hollembaek, who withdrew from Le Moyne in January 1957, because of academic difficulties, re-enrolled and returned for his senior season. Chuck Sammons and Bob Bostick, who would become Le Moyne's first black varsity player, competed for a starting role during the preseason, but Bostick was hampered by injuries. Practices started at Grant Junior High School in October and moved to the armory in November. The team scrimmaged against Albany State (NY), Cornell and Ithaca. Morrissey was named captain. Tommy Burns, a sophomore transfer from Georgetown, was not eligible to play until the January 24 game at Saint Michael's because of NCAA transfer rules.

Turnovers and rebounding doomed the Dolphins in their December 1 season opener against Villanova at the Palestra, an 83–67 loss. After trailing by seven points at halftime, the Dolphins got within six points at 39–33 with a minute and a half gone by in the second half. The Wildcats extended the lead to 11 points, but two straight baskets by Dick Nendza, who finished with 12 points off the bench, brought Le Moyne back within seven points at 49–42 with 13:42 to play. Led by their captain, Joe Ryan, who scored four baskets in a 68-second stretch at one point, Villanova cashed in their fast-break opportunities created by a string of errant Le Moyne passes and had a 20-point bulge five minutes later, putting the game out of reach. The size-challenged Dolphins were outrebounded, 67–28. Dick Lynch scored 20 points and grabbed 12 rebounds to lead Le Moyne, but he shot only 8 for 21 from the floor. Sophomore Bob Bostick made his varsity debut, becoming the program's first black player; he scored one point in limited action.

Sophomores Dave Rose, Frank Graziadei and Ron Januszka were added to Le Moyne's list of available players following the Villanova game.

After watching his team fall behind Oswego State, 44–34, in the Dolphins' home opener on December 6, coach Tommy Niland sent 5'11" sophomore Bob Bostick into the game at center to substitute for fellow sophomore Chuck Sammons. Bostick, who finished with six points, provided the spark Le Moyne needed, inspiring the Dolphins with his rebounding and defense. A spectacular out-of-bounds save and pass by Bostick to Dennis Morrissey led to a layup that brought Le Moyne within a point at 54–53. After the Lakers turned the ball over on the ensuing possession, Bostick's jump shot gave the Dolphins their first lead of the second half with 2:55 to play. John Dobbertin's free throw made it a 22–10 run. After Oswego State tied the game at 56, Dick Lynch's free throws gave Le Moyne the lead with 45 seconds left. Ron Davis, who had a game-high 18 points, missed a jump shot on the Lakers' next possession, and Dobbertin hit another pair of free throws to put the game out of reach, as the Dolphins held on for a 62–57 victory. Dick Lynch scored 15 points to lead Le Moyne. The game was interrupted by a brief scrap between Davis and Bob Hollembaek that led to both benches clearing and fans spilling onto the floor, before order was restored by the officials. No one was ejected. In a separate incident at halftime, groups of Le Moyne and Oswego State fans got involved in a scuffle on the court, which was broken up by armory staff.

Just two games into the season, Le Moyne lost starting senior playmaker John Dobbertin, who suffered torn knee ligaments in a tobogganing accident. He was expected to miss at least a month.

Hours before the Dolphins' December 13 home game against Saint Peter's, Bob Bostick left the team, citing financial reasons. Left without a backup at center, Chuck Sammons responded with a double-double, playing all 40 minutes while scoring a team-high 17 points, grabbing 10 rebounds and hitting the deciding jump shot with two seconds to play in a 70–68 Le Moyne victory over the Peacocks, a team that had played in the NIT each of the previous two seasons. Sammons scored nine of Le Moyne's final 11 points of the game. Saint Peter's built an eight-point lead in the first half, but the Dolphins, fueled by the aggressive defense of Dennis Morrissey and the strong rebounding of Dick Lynch, went on an 18–9 run over the final seven minutes to claim a one-point lead at the break. Dick Nendza had six points during the run, and Morrisey and Lynch each added four. After the Peacocks switched to a frustrating zone defense and took a five-point lead early in the second half, Le Moyne regained their composure. The game was tied five times over the final six minutes, but the Dolphins appeared to have the edge when they took a 67–63 lead with 2:10 remaining. However, Saint Peter's tied the game with 1:17 to play. Le Moyne froze the ball for 1:15 and began looking for Lynch for the final shot in the closing seconds. However, Lynch was well covered, and he passed the ball to Bob Hollembaek, who found Sammons open on the left side for the game winner. The Dolphins improved to 2–1 on the season and 1–0 in MECAA play.

The Dolphins traveled to Burlington, Vermont for the Saint Michael's Invitational Tournament on December 18, and drew the host in the opening round. Saint Michael's had been the runner-up in the 1958 College Division tournament and was ranked no. 9 in the small college poll. Four of the six players in their rotation from the previous season were still with the team. Dick Lynch scored 18 first-half points to power Le Moyne to a 37–35 lead at the break. Hank Gretkowski, who was the Knights' top rebounder and led them with 24 points, was charged with the task of guarding Lynch in the second half and slowed him down a bit. With the Dolphins leading, 41–39, early in the second half, Saint Michael's embarked on a 9–0 run and seized control of the game. Le Moyne made a run and got within two points at 59–57 with five minutes to play, but the Knights scored the next four points, and the Dolphins succumbed, 71–63. Lynch scored 12 points in the second half to finish with a game-high 30. Lynch had 14 field goals in the game, all coming on jump shots.

The following night, the Dolphins took control of the consolation game against Assumption early and romped to a 75–61 victory. The easy win took Dick Lynch out of consideration for the tournament's most valuable player award, as he played just over half the game and finished with 14 points, doing more passing than shooting. Dick Nendza scored a game-high 22 points for Le Moyne, who led by 21 points at halftime and by as many as 25 points in the second half. Bill Young started at center in place of Chuck Sammons, who missed the game with a cold, and scored 21 points.

Playing on the third straight night and in their fifth game in eight days, the Dolphins came out strong, sparked by Dick Lynch's 15 first-half points, in their December 20 game at Siena, building a 15-point lead and holding a nine-point edge at intermission. The Indians used a full-court press in the second half to get back into the game and sent it to overtime with the score tied at 53. The tired Dolphins appeared to be on the verge of a loss, playing without Chuck Sammons, who missed his second straight game with a cold, and losing the services of Bob Hollembaek, Dennis Morrissey and Dick Nendza, all of whom fouled out during the overtime period. With Le Moyne trailing, 65–62, in the final minute, sophomore Dave Rose, finding himself in a crucial spot with the Dolphins short on manpower, hit a jump shot, his first basket of the season, to cut the deficit to one point. On Siena's next possession, the Dolphins forced a turnover, and Lynch grabbed the loose ball and was fouled with three seconds on the clock. Lynch, who finished with a game-high 25 points, hit both ends of the one-and-one to give Le Moyne a 66–65 victory, improving their record to 5–2 overall and 2–0 in MECAA play. This was Le Moyne's 26th all-time win over a University Division/major program.

John Dobbertin had the cast removed from his injured knee in late December, but he was not expected to be available to play until early February. John Finnegan suffered a knee injury in practice in early January and was expected to miss two weeks.

John Dobbertin returned to action with his right knee heavily bandaged on January 31, and sparked a rally that pushed the Dolphins to a 74–61 home victory over St. Francis (NY). Dobbertin, usually a playmaking point guard, entered the game with 11 minutes to play and Le Moyne leading, 50–48. He exploded for 13 points during an 18–7 run over seven minutes that gave the Dolphins a 13-point bulge. Dick Nendza and Chuck Sammons joined Dobbertin with a team-high 13 points for Le Moyne. The Terriers played a box-and-one defense with Fred Schneider closely guarding Dick Lynch and holding him to just seven points on 3-for-6 shooting. Two of Lynch's baskets were on tip-ins following offensive rebounds. Senior Bob Scarborough made his season debut but played only briefly; it was his only appearance of the season and the final game of his collegiate career. Sophomore transfer Tommy Burns, who had played the previous two games after satisfying the NCAA waiting period, missed the game with the flu. The Dolphins improved to 9–3 overall and 3–0 in MECAA play. This was Le Moyne's 27th all-time victory over a University Division/major program.

The flu bug swept through the Dolphins following the St. Francis game. In addition to Tommy Burns, Dick Nendza, Chuck Sammons and Ron Januszka were unable to attend classes or practice. A doctor advised John Dobbertin to rest his right knee three days after his seven-minute appearance. Bob Hollembaek jammed his finger in the St. Francis game. The day before the team's next game, a February 7 home tilt against Gannon, only the status of Sammons remained doubtful, but coach Tommy Niland was hopeful he would be able to play. Sammons, Burns, Nendza and Dobbertin all played in the Gannon game with Sammons topping the wounded warriors, scoring 12 points. Dick Lynch had a team-high 16 points, leading the Dolphins to a 58–52 win. Lynch was also Le Moyne's top rebounder with 11 boards and the primary defender on Gannon's top scorer, Pete Russo, holding him to eight points on 4-for-24 shooting.

With a record of 10–4, the Dolphins were listed as one of five upstate New York teams under consideration for a berth in the NCAA College Division tournament. Le Moyne's February 13 home contest against King's, also 10–4, was thought to be a must-win game to preserve the Dolphins' chances. The Dolphins trailed by six points at halftime but used a 9–0 run to open the second half and take the lead. The game was tight the rest of the way with multiple lead changes and neither team able to pull away from the other. King's was up by three points with four minutes to play, but a free throw by Dick Lynch and a driving layup by John Dobbertin tied the game at 68. After two Monarchs free throws restored their lead, Lynch's basket tied the game at 70 with a minute and a half to go. King's planned to hold the ball for a final shot, but Clarence Brown misread the armory clock, which was notoriously difficult to decipher, and put up a shot, which was rebounded by Tommy Burns with a minute remaining. The Dolphins called timeout to set up a play, which resulted in a Lynch jumper that missed to the left but was rebounded and put back by Burns with five seconds to go. King's got off a final desperation shot that fell short at the buzzer, and Le Moyne had a 72–70 victory. Lynch scored a game-high 30 points for the Dolphins. Burns led Le Moyne with seven rebounds.

After a 58–54 loss at Iona on February 15, 1959, the Dolphins' overall record stood at 11–5, and they were knocked from the MECAA's first-place perch, which they had occupied all season, falling to 3–1 in the league, while Iona stood at 3–0. The Gaels had three players taller than Dick Lynch, Le Moyne's tallest player at 6'4", and used their size to their advantage in avenging a 20-point loss to the Dolphins the previous season that may have cost Iona an NIT bid. Bob Hollembaek, who was only 5'9", scored 17 points to lead Le Moyne.

It was thought by Dolphins followers that impressive wins in the next two games against Hartwick and highly ranked Steubenville, who went undefeated in the 1957–58 season, would be enough to secure a berth in the NCAA tournament. However, after Le Moyne beat Hartwick, 82–62, on February 18, and Steubenville, 74–56, on February 20, the tournament selection committee remained silent. Dick Lynch and Chuck Sammons each had a double-double in the Hartwick game. Lynch scored 16 points and grabbed 11 rebounds, while Sammons had 10 points and pulled down a team-high 16 boards, leading Le Moyne to a 46–23 rebounding advantage over the smaller Warriors. Dick Nendza topped the Dolphins' scoring list with 17 points against Hartwick. Two nights before Steubenville's trip to Syracuse, they suffered their first home loss in five years. Chuck Sammons scored 17 points to lead the Dolphins in their stunning wire-to-wire win over the Barons.

After the Steubenville game, regional selectors indicated that they had not yet reached a decision on tournament bids and were waiting to see the results of key games involving teams under serious consideration. Le Moyne was now listed as the top team among upstate New York contenders. The Dolphins hit the road for back-to-back games, beating Scranton, 79–67, on February 22, and King's, 67–66, in overtime the following night. Dick Nendza scored 24 points on 9-for-13 shooting to lead Le Moyne against Scranton. Bob Hollembaek, who had supplanted John Dobbertin as the starting point guard following the latter's knee injury, saw only limited action in the King's game, as he battled a cold. Dobbertin filled in admirably, leading a 16–2 late first-half run that put the Dolphins up by nine points. The Monarchs stormed back in the second half and had a 60–58 lead, until Dick Lynch's basket tied the game with two and a half minutes to play. King's decided to hold for the last shot of regulation. John Kapioski's 10-foot jump shot with five seconds to go missed short and to the right. Clarence Brown grabbed the offensive rebound, but his potential game-winning layup was blocked by Chuck Sammons. Lynch's long shot at the buzzer missed. The Dolphins scored the first four points of overtime, three of them coming from Dobbertin, and led the rest of the way. Dennis Morrissey's pair of free throws with seven seconds remaining gave Le Moyne a three-point lead. Paul Nicelli hit a layup at the buzzer and drew contact, but no foul was called despite protests from King's, giving Le Moyne the one-point victory. Nendza missed the King's game with knee and ankle injuries suffered against Scranton. Lynch scored 21 points to lead the Dolphins against the Monarchs.

The two road victories in Pennsylvania improved the Dolphins' record to 15–5 and were enough for Le Moyne to get the call from the Middle Atlantic States regional selectors, earning their first berth in the NCAA College Division tournament.

Before the NCAA tournament, there remained unfinished business in the MECAA, specifically a home game against archrival Siena. Iona had beaten St. Francis (NY) at Madison Square Garden on February 26, to improve their league record to 4–0 with one conference game remaining at Saint Peter's. The Siena-Le Moyne game and the Iona-Saint Peter's game were both scheduled for February 28. A Le Moyne win and an Iona loss would give both teams a 4–1 MECAA record and a share of the conference title, even though Le Moyne had lost its head-to-head matchup with Iona, since no tiebreaker was in place. Aside from their desire to go undefeated in the league and win the MECAA crown outright, Iona was thought to be on the bubble for a bid to the NCAA tournament and desperately needed a win.

The Peacocks gained a 73–60 victory over the Gaels to finish 3–1 in MECAA play and drop Iona to 4–1. Le Moyne had an eight-point lead with four minutes to play against Siena, but the Indians stormed back and cut the Dolphins' lead to one point with two minutes to play. Le Moyne tried to freeze the ball for the remainder of the game to protect the lead, but a steal by Jerry Brehm, who had 25 points, gave Siena possession with a minute and a half on the clock. Siena went into a deep freeze to hold for the final shot, which came from Jack Weaver and fell short with two seconds to go. The rebound was grabbed by both Le Moyne's Dick Lynch and Howie Huntington of Siena. With one second remaining, Siena controlled the ensuing jump ball but was unable to get off a shot, giving the Dolphins a 60–59 victory and a share of the MECAA title, the first conference championship in the program's history. The Dolphins had built a 10-point first half lead, despite the taller Indians controlling the boards. After Le Moyne center Chuck Sammons fouled out on the first play of the second half, Siena's rebounding advantage strengthened. Lynch scored 15 points to lead the Dolphins. Dick Nendza, slowed by knee and ankle injuries, played sparingly. The win closed the Dolphins home schedule with a perfect 10–0 record. This was Le Moyne's 28th all-time victory over a University Division/major program. Iona's loss to Saint Peter's may have cost the Gaels an NCAA tournament bid. St. Bonaventure had withdrawn from the MECAA just as the 1958–59 season was beginning. The Brown Indians only had four games scheduled against MECAA opponents. St. Bonaventure ultimately won all four of those contests, including a victory over Iona, which did not count as a loss on the Gaels' league record.

Le Moyne entered the postseason 17–5 and ranked no. 20 nationally (tied with Stetson) in the small college coaches poll. The Dolphins won their first ever NCAA tournament game, 72–66, over Williams in Burlington, Vermont. Dick Lynch led Le Moyne with 33 points, shooting 14 for 22 from the floor.

In the Regional Final Sweet 16 game, Le Moyne fell short, 71–70, against Saint Michael's, who was ranked no. 15 in the small college coaches poll and playing on their home court. Saint Michael's had led by as many as nine points and were on top, 71–64, with 1:16 on the clock. Le Moyne used a full-court press to get back into the game, and Dick Lynch, who had 20 points, was fouled with 23 seconds to play and the Dolphins down, 71–68, but he missed both free throws. After Ralph St. Peter missed the front end of a one-and-one for the Purple Knights, the Dolphins collected the rebound and called timeout with four seconds remaining. Denny Morrissey drove to the basket, hoping to draw a foul. He scored at the buzzer, but there was no foul, and the Dolphins lost by a point. Three of Le Moyne's six losses during the 1958–59 season came at the hands of Saint Michael's, all in Burlington. Lynch was unanimously named to the All-Regional team. The Dolphins finished the season 18–6 overall and co-champions of the MECAA. Le Moyne was 3–2 against University Division opponents and 15–4 against College Division and non-NCAA foes with three of their losses coming at the hands of Saint Michael's on the Purple Knights' home court.

Le Moyne junior Dick Lynch was named to the All-MECAA first team for the second straight year. Senior Bob Hollembaek made the second team, and sophomore Chuck Sammons earned honorable mention. Dolphins head coach Tommy Niland was unanimously selected as 1959 MECAA coach of the year. Lynch also earned honorable mention on the Catholic All-America team.

== Return to the tournament (1959–1960) ==
Dick Lynch, the Dolphins' leading scorer the previous two years, returned for his senior season in 1959–60. Graduation cost Le Moyne four rotation players: captain Dennis Morrisey, Dick Nendza and a pair of point guards who shared the starting role during different stretches of the previous season, John Dobbertin and Bob Hollembaek. Starting center Chuck Sammons returned for his junior season, while junior Tommy Burns was expected to move into a starting role. Reserves Bill Young, a senior, and juniors Frank Graziadei and Dave Rose returned. The team expected to add sophomores John Caveny, Bill Stanley and Bill Ray, an armed forces veteran, while Joe Costello, Gerry Giocondo, Larry Page and Don Britschgi were candidates for roster spots. Practices started on October 15, at Grant Junior High School and moved to the armory in November. Lynch was named team captain. The Dolphins scrimmaged against Canisius (Tommy Niland's alma mater), Albany State (NY) and Cornell.

Dolphins star Dick Lynch engaged in some cross training during the offseason. He drove a cement truck over the summer to toughen himself up. He also shot a 76 to lead the Dolphins golf team to a victory at the MECAA fall sports carnival.

Captain Dick Lynch scored 21 points to lead the Dolphins to a 60–46 victory at Siena on December 7, 1959. In winning their MECAA opener, Le Moyne improved to 2–0 overall on the young season. This was Le Moyne's 29th all-time win over a University Division/major program.

Dick Lynch scored 30 points to lead the Dolphins to their 17th straight home victory on February 2, 1960, an 83–69 triumph over Saint Michael's. The Dolphins relied on 57% shooting from the floor to overcome the height advantage of the Purple Knights, who won the rebounding battle but shot field goals at only a 40% clip. Senior Bill Young, who was ruled academically ineligible for the spring semester, came off the bench and played in his final collegiate game, after Chuck Sammons fouled out with 15 minutes to play. Young finished with 10 points. Sophomore Joe Costello took the point guard reins from Tommy Burns, after Burns fouled out with five minutes remaining, and Costello's ball handling skills dazzled the crowd. Le Moyne opened the game with a 17–2 run over the first seven and one-half minutes, and Saint Michael's never got closer than three points down the rest of the way. The win improved the Dolphins' record to 7–2.

The Dolphins took over first place in the MECAA with a 77–66 win at St. Francis (NY) on February 5. Le Moyne overcame the foul trouble of their captain and leading scorer, Dick Lynch, who drew four fouls in the game's first 13 minutes. Lynch sat out the final seven minutes of the first half and played cautiously in the second half, looking to pass rather than create shots. He attempted only four field goals in the game and finished with six points. Sophomore John Caveny paced the Dolphins with 19 points. Sophomore Bill Stanley, recovering from a thigh muscle injury, had a double-double with 11 points and 10 rebounds. Junior Chuck Sammons also had a double-double with 13 points and a team-high 13 boards collected against taller opponents. Sophomore Bill Ray, who had impressed in an exhibition game, after getting additional minutes due to Caveny's injury, had another strong game with 12 points on 5-for-6 shooting and grabbed six rebounds. The Dolphins, who shot 50% from the floor, improved to 8–2 in collegiate contests and 2–0 in MECAA play. The Terriers fell to 3–1 in league games. The win gave the Dolphins 30 victories all-time against University Division/major programs.

The Dolphins scored a major upset on February 13, a home triumph over NIT hopeful Iona. Le Moyne returned to first place in the MECAA with the win, tied with St. Francis (NY) at 3–1 in league play. Followers of both teams thought the outcome greatly improved the Dolphins' chances of receiving a second straight NCAA tournament berth while seriously damaging Iona's aspirations of a trip to the NIT. After the Gaels took their biggest lead of the night at 13–8, Le Moyne responded with a 13–0 run to seize control of the game, and the Dolphins led the rest of the way. After claiming a nine-point halftime lead, Le Moyne opened the second half by making their first four shots from the floor, three of them by captain Dick Lynch, who had a game-high 20 points, and the Dolphins' advantage expanded to 15 points at 35–20. Le Moyne's lead grew as large as 18 points, 42–24, with seven minutes to play. Iona went on an 18–7 run, using their size advantage to tip in offensive rebounds, and cut their deficit to seven points, 49–42, with four and one-half minutes remaining. The Dolphins responded with a 10–0 run and secured a 59–44 victory. Le Moyne froze the ball for stretches during this game to allow their starters to catch a breath, because they were missing two key reserves. Joe Costello missed the game with the flu, and Bill Ray tore ligaments in his ankle in Le Moyne's previous game, a 73–56 victory over Cortland State. Sophomore Bill Stanley had a double-double with 15 points and 12 rebounds. Sophomore John Caveny scored 16 points and thrilled the crowd of 1,500 with his ball handling. The Dolphins extended their home winning streak to 19 games with the victory. This was Le Moyne's 31st all-time win over a University Division/major program.

On February 18, the Northeast Region selection committee for the NCAA tournament confirmed that Le Moyne, 11–3 in collegiate contests plus an exhibition win over Stewart Air Force Base, was a strong contender for an at-large berth and a candidate for hosting regional games. The Dolphins were offered a berth in the 1960 NCAA tournament on February 23. The team was on the road at the time and recorded another victory over St. Lawrence that night, before accepting the bid the following day.

Before moving on to the NCAA tournament, Le Moyne had a home game with archrival Siena, and a win would clinch at least a tie for the MECAA title. An Iona home loss against Saint Peter's that same night coupled with a Dolphins victory would give Le Moyne the MECAA championship outright. The Peacocks did their part, beating the Gaels, 67–57. Although the Dolphins were less efficient on offense than they had been in recent home games, they recorded their 20th consecutive home victory, 61–48, over the Indians to win the MECAA crown outright. However, the win came at a great cost. Early in the game, Dolphins captain and leading scorer, Dick Lynch, collided with Jim Mannix of Siena and twisted his ankle. Lynch was removed from the game but returned and played until only 30 seconds remained, leaving to a thunderous ovation that lasted several minutes. Siena coach Dan Cunha walked over to the Le Moyne bench to congratulate Lynch on a fine collegiate career. Later, it was learned that the ankle injury would impair Lynch's ability to participate in the NCAA tournament. Despite playing through the injury, Lynch had a game-high 18 points on 8-for-12 shooting in the final home game of his collegiate career. Bill Ray returned to action after missing three games with an ankle injury. The Dolphins shot 44% from the field, while holding the Indians to a 32% clip. The win gave Le Moyne 32 all-time victories over University Division/major programs.

The 1960 NCAA tournament's Northeast Regional was hosted by St. Michael's in Burlington, Vermont, as it had been the previous year. It was there that the Dolphins met Saint Anselm in the regional semifinals on March 3. Le Moyne and Saint Anselm had coincidentally been scheduled to play each other in Syracuse on March 1, but the teams cancelled the game when they were matched up in the tournament. Playing without Dick Lynch, the Dolphins missed their first nine shots from the field and fell behind early, 10–1. The Hawks stretched the lead to 24–13, and junior Chuck Sammons was called for his fourth personal foul with eight minutes to play in the first half. The Burlington Memorial Auditorium erupted in cheers from all sides, when coach Tommy Niland replaced Sammons with Lynch, who was clearly hobbled and in obvious pain. Two minutes later, Lynch was taken out of the game. A Dolphins flurry led by Bill Stanley, who had 22 points and 14 rebounds in the game, in the final minute of the first half cut the Saint Anselm lead to seven points. Sammons, who finished with 10 points, finally fouled out with eight minutes to play, and John Caveny was disqualified three minutes later with the Dolphins trailing, 76–69. Stanley drew his fifth foul with two minutes to go. Saint Anselm controlled the final five minutes of the game to put away an 88–75 victory. The Dolphins and their fans were left to wonder what could have been had Lynch been healthy.

The following night, the Dolphins lost the regional third-place game to Assumption, 94–68, to finish fourth in the region. Bill Stanley had 20 points in the consolation game and was named to the All-Regional second team. Injured Dolphins captain Dick Lynch did not dress for the game. Junior Frank Graziadei scored his first points of the season in the consolation game. Junior Dave Rose got more playing time than he had in any previous game of the season and scored eight points to the delight of his parents, who made the trip. Adding insult to injury, head coach Tommy Niland's overcoat was stolen during the loss to Assumption. The Dolphins finished the season 13–5 in collegiate contests. Le Moyne was 4–1 against University Division opponents and 9–4 versus College Division foes.

Le Moyne's head coach, Tommy Niland, was unanimously chosen as 1960 MECAA coach of the year. Niland was also named Catholic small college coach of the year. Dick Lynch was named a MECAA All-Star, a first-team Eastern College Athletic Conference (ECAC) small college All-Star and a second-team Catholic small college All-Star. John Caveny and Bill Stanley were both named All-MECAA second team. The 1959–60 Dolphins were inducted into the Le Moyne College Athletic Hall of Fame as a team in 2011.

== See also ==
- History of Le Moyne Dolphins men's basketball (1948–1958)
- History of Le Moyne Dolphins men's basketball (1960–1963)
