= 1965–66 Drexel Dragons men's basketball team =

American college basketball season

1965–66 Drexel Dragons men's basketball

MAC College–Southern regular season champions

NCAA tournament Regional semifinals, L 54–62
- Conference: Middle Atlantic Conferences
- College–Southern
- Record: 20–4 (12–0 MAC)
- Head coach: Samuel Cozen (14th season)
- Home arena: Sayre High School

The 1965–66 Drexel Dragons men's basketball team represented Drexel Institute of Technology during the 1965–66 men's basketball season. The Dragons, led by 14th year head coach Samuel Cozen, played their home games at Sayre High School and were members of the College–Southern division of the Middle Atlantic Conferences (MAC).

The team finished the regular season 19–1, and finished in 1st place in the MAC in the regular season.

Drexel reached the finals of the MAC tournament, where they lost to Albright.

== Roster ==
1965–66 Drexel Dragons men's basketball team
Players	Coaches
Pos. / # / Name / Height / Weight / Year / Previous school / Hometown; / / / — / —	Head coach: Samuel Cozen (Temple); Assistant coach(es) Legend: (C) Team captain; (S) Suspended; (I) Ineligible; (W) Walk-on; Injured; Current redshirt

== Schedule ==
Date time, TV	Rank^{#}	Opponent^{#}	Result	Record	High points	High rebounds	High assists	Site (attendance) city, state
Regular season
Unknown*		Delaware Valley	W 92–63	1–0	–	–	–	
Unknown		Upsala	W 72–67	2–0 (1–0)	–	–	–	
December 17, 1965		at Swarthmore	W 84–58	3–0 (2–0)	–	–	–	
Unknown*		vs. Mansfield	W 91–62	4–0	–	–	–	
December 1965*		vs. Cheyney	L 51–72	4–1	–	–	–	
Unknown*		Delaware	W 66–61	5–1	–	–	–	
January 11, 1966		at Lebanon Valley	W 63–60	6–1 (3–0)	–	–	–	
Unknown*		West Chester	W 73–67 ^{2OT}	7–1	–	–	–	
Unknown		Ursinus	W 72–61	8–1 (4–0)	–	–	–	
Unknown		Pennsylvania Military College	W 55–34	9–1 (5–0)	–	–	–	
Unknown		Moravian	W 63–46	10–1 (6–0)	–	–	–	
Unknown*		Rider	W 92–84 ^{OT}	11–1	–	–	–	
January 29, 1966		at Franklin & Marshall	W 76–60	12–1 (7–0)	–	–	–	
February 2, 1966		at Swarthmore	W 85–48	13–1 (8–0)	–	–	–	
Unknown*		Delaware	W 82–76	14–1	–	–	–	
February 9, 1966		at Haverford	W 56–49	15–1 (9–0)	–	–	–	Ryan Gym; Haverford, PA
February 12, 1966		Johns Hopkins	W 86–52	16–1 (10–0)	–	–	–	Sayre High School; Philadelphia, PA
Unknown		Wagner	W 84–58	17–1 (11–0)	–	–	–	
February 19, 1966		at Scranton	W 67–65	18–1 (12–0)	–	–	–	Scranton, PA
Unknown*		Muhlenberg	W 93–50	19–1	–	–	–	
1966 Middle Atlantic Conference men's basketball tournament
February 25, 1966	(1)	vs. (2) Haverford; Semifinals	W 61–33	20–1	–	–	–	Saint Joseph's Field House; Philadelphia, PA
February 26, 1966	(1)	vs. (2) Albright; Conference Championship	L 45–58	20–2	–	–	–	Saint Joseph's Field House; Philadelphia, PA
1966 NCAA College Division basketball tournament
March 4, 1966; 7:30 pm		vs. Long Island; Regional semifinals	L 54–62	20–3	–	–	–	Albright Field House (3,200); Reading, PA
March 5, 1966		vs. Albright; Regional third place Game	L 61–78	20–4	–	–	–	Albright Field House; Reading, PA
*Non-conference game. ^{#}Rankings from AP. (#) Tournament seedings in parentheses. All times are in Eastern Time.
