= Bob Jones (basketball, born 1940) =

American basketball coach (1940–2021)

Biographical details
- Born: February 20, 1940; Bellevue, Kentucky, U.S.
- Died: May 14, 2021 (aged 81); Cincinnati, Ohio, U.S.

Playing career
- 1959–1962: Georgetown (KY)

Coaching career (HC unless noted)
- 1965–1967: Georgetown (KY) (assistant)
- 1967–1972: Kentucky Wesleyan (assistant)
- 1972–1980: Kentucky Wesleyan

Administrative career (AD unless noted)
- 1972–1980: Kentucky Wesleyan

Accomplishments and honors

Championships
- NCAA Division II Tournament (1973)

Awards
- NABC Division II Coach of the Year (1973)

Robert Earl Jones (February 20, 1940 – May 14, 2021) was an American college basketball coach who was a men's head coach at Kentucky Wesleyan College. He played basketball at Georgetown College in Kentucky. He worked two years as assistant coach at Georgetown College before becoming assistant-coach with the Kentucky Wesleyan Panthers in 1967. In 1972, he was promoted to head coach, after the resignation of Bob Daniels. Jones was also named the school's athletic director, succeeding William Douglas, who had resigned earlier in the year.

Jones was fired as head coach in December 1979, but agreed to finish the season. On February 25, 1980, he coached his last game at Kentucky Wesleyan. He was hampered in his career by ailment and accusations of unenthusiastic recruiting. Jones resigned as athletic director in July.

Jones brought The Panthers to the 1973 NCAA Men's Division II Basketball Championship.

Jones died in Cincinnati on May 14, 2021, at age 81.

== Head coaching record ==
Record table
Season	Team	Overall	Conference	Standing	Postseason
Kentucky Wesleyan (Independent) (1972–1978)
1972–73	Kentucky Wesleyan	24–6			NCAA Div II Champion
1973–74	Kentucky Wesleyan	20–6			NCAA Div II Sweet 16
1974–75	Kentucky Wesleyan	12–13			
1975–76	Kentucky Wesleyan	14–11			
1976–77	Kentucky Wesleyan	11–14			
1977–78	Kentucky Wesleyan	14–11			
Kentucky Wesleyan (Great Lakes Valley Conference) (1978–1980)
1978–79	Kentucky Wesleyan	12–14	2–6	5th	
1979–80	Kentucky Wesleyan	12–15	4–6	4th	
Kentucky Wesleyan:		119–90	6–12		
Total:		119–90			
National champion Postseason invitational champion Conference regular season champion Conference regular season and conference tournament champion Division regular season champion Division regular season and conference tournament champion Conference tournament champion
