= 1959–60 Drexel Dragons men's basketball team =

American college basketball season

1959–60 Drexel Dragons men's basketball

MAC College–Southern regular season champions

One-game playoff vs. Wagner, W 70–53

NCAA tournament Regional semifinals, L 44–56
- Conference: Middle Atlantic Conferences
- College–Southern
- Record: 12–7 (10–4 MAC)
- Head coach: Samuel Cozen (8th season)
- Home arena: Sayre High School

1959–60 MAC men's basketball standings
	Conf.				Overall
Team	W		L	PCT	W		L	PCT
University
Saint Joseph's*	7	–	1	.875	20	–	7	.741
La Salle	6	–	1	.857	16	–	6	.727
Temple	9	–	2	.818	17	–	9	.654
Gettysburg	7	–	3	.700	15	–	11	.577
Bucknell	6	–	5	.545	10	–	11	.476
Rutgers	4	–	4	.500	11	–	14	.440
Lafayette	6	–	7	.462	12	–	13	.480
Lehigh	4	–	10	.286	6	–	16	.273
Muhlenberg	3	–	11	.214	8	–	18	.308
Delaware	1	–	9	.100	7	–	16	.304
College–Northern
Wagner	10	–	0	1.000		–		–
Albright	10	–	3	.769	16	–	8	.667
Wilkes		–		–	6	–	7	.462
Juniata		–		–	5	–	12	.294
Elizabethtown		–		–		–		–
Lebanon Valley		–		–		–		–
Moravian		–		–		–		–
Stevens**		–		–		–		–
Hofstra		–		–		–		–
Susquehanna		–		–		–		–
Lycoming		–		–		–		–
Scranton		–		–		–		–
Upsala		–		–		–		–
College–Southern
Drexel †	10	–	4	.714	12	–	7	.632
Pennsylvania Military	10	–	7	.588	12	–	8	.600
Ursinus		–		–	9	–	6	.600
Haverford	3	–	9	.250	7	–	9	.438
Washington (MD)**		–		–	10	–	9	.526
Franklin & Marshall		–		–	3	–	14	.176
Johns Hopkins		–		–		–		–
Swarthmore		–		–		–		–
West Chester**		–		–		–		–
Western Maryland		–		–		–		–
Dickinson		–		–		–		–
† College Division playoff game winner * – University Division regular-season champion ** – Ineligible for championship

The 1959–60 Drexel Dragons men's basketball team represented Drexel Institute of Technology during the 1959–60 men's basketball season. The Dragons, led by 8th year head coach Samuel Cozen, played their home games at Sayre High School and were members of the College–Southern division of the Middle Atlantic Conferences (MAC).

The team finished the season 12–7, and finished in 1st place in the MAC in the regular season.

== Roster ==
1959–60 Drexel Dragons men's basketball team
Players
Coaches

Pos.	#	Name	Height	Weight	Year	Previous school	Hometown
		Robert Morgan	5 ft 10 in (1.78 m)	—
		George Holloway	—	—
		Pete Wilson	—	—
		Rich Hilmer	—	—
		Ben Brown	—	—
		Bud Henry	—	—
		Bruce Zimmerman	—	—
		Emil Schoen	—	—
		Herb Heffner	—	—
		George Schaeffer	—	—
		Joe Sacco	—	—
		Irv Jaffe	—	—
		Jim Hoffman	—	—

Head coach

- Samuel Cozen (Temple)

Assistant coach(es)

Legend

- (C) Team captain
- (S) Suspended
- (I) Ineligible
- (W) Walk-on
- Injured
- Current redshirt

Roster

== Schedule ==
Date time, TV	Rank^{#}	Opponent^{#}	Result	Record	High points	High rebounds	High assists	Site (attendance) city, state
Regular season
January 6, 1960*		Rider	L 53–70	0–1	19 – Hilmer	–	–	
January 9, 1960		at Pennsylvania Military College	L 65–71	0–2 (0–1)	–	–	–	Hyatt Armory; Chester, PA
January 13, 1960		at Haverford	W 75–65	1–2 (1–1)	29 – Hilmer	–	–	Ryan Gym; Haverford, PA
January 1960		Ursinus	W 67–50	2–2 (2–1)	–	–	–	
January 23, 1960		Johns Hopkins	W 77–69	3–2 (3–1)	–	19 – Henry	–	Sayre High School; Philadelphia, PA
January 27, 1960		at West Chester	L 60–79	3–3 (3–2)	14 – Morgan	–	–	
January 30, 1960*		Pratt	W 86–72	4–3	–	–	–	
Unknown		Elizabethtown	W 89–67	5–3 (4–2)	–	–	–	
February 3, 1960		Swarthmore	W 64–38	6–3 (5–2)	–	–	–	Sayre High School; Philadelphia, PA
February 6, 1960		Franklin & Marshall	W 86–66	7–3 (6–2)	29 – Morgan	–	–	Sayre High School; Philadelphia, PA
February 10, 1960		at Swarthmore	W 83–55	8–3 (7–2)	–	–	–	
February 1960		Pennsylvania Military College	W 79–75	9–3 (8–2)	–	–	–	
February 1960		Haverford	W 75–65	10–3 (9–2)	–	–	–	Sayre High School; Philadelphia, PA
February 15, 1960		Lebanon Valley	L 64–74	10–4 (9–3)	–	–	–	Sayre High School; Philadelphia, PA
February 1960		Wagner	L 63–79	10–5 (9–4)	–	–	–	
February 24, 1960		Wilkes	W 91–81	11–5 (10–4)	24 – Tied	–	–	
1960 Middle Atlantic Conference men's basketball tournament
February 27, 1960; 3:30 pm		Wagner; College Division Championship	W 70–53	12–5	25 – Morgan	–	–	Sayre High School; Philadelphia, PA
1960 NCAA College Division basketball tournament
March 4, 1960; 9:30 pm		vs. Fairfield; Regional semifinals	L 44–56	12–6	–	–	–	Wagner College Gym; Staten Island, NY
March 5, 1960; 7:30 pm		vs. Upsala; Regional third place Game	L 69–74	12–7	–	–	–	Wagner College Gym; Staten Island, NY
*Non-conference game. ^{#}Rankings from AP. (#) Tournament seedings in parentheses. All times are in Eastern Time.

== Awards ==
Robert Morgan

- All-District Small College Team
