= Kentucky Wesleyan Panthers men's basketball =

- University: Kentucky Wesleyan College
- Head coach: Drew Cooper (3rd season)
- Location: Owensboro, Kentucky
- Arena: Sportscenter (capacity: 5,500)
- Conference: G-MAC
- Nickname: Panthers
- Colors: Wesleyan purple and medium gray

NCAA Division II tournament champions
- 1966, 1968, 1969, 1973, 1987, 1990, 1999, 2001
Other NCAA Division II tournament results
Runner-up	1957, 1998, 2000, 2002, 2003
Elite Eight	1957, 1960, 1966, 1967, 1968, 1969, 1971, 1973, 1982, 1984, 1985, 1987, 1989, 1990, 1992, 1998, 1999, 2000, 2001, 2002, 2003
Appearances	1957, 1960, 1961, 1964, 1967, 1968, 1969, 1970, 1971, 1972, 1973, 1974, 1982, 1983, 1984, 1985, 1986, 1987, 1988, 1989, 1990, 1991, 1992, 1994, 1995, 1998, 1999, 2000, 2001, 2002, 2003, 2004, 2008, 2009, 2010, 2011, 2012, 2016, 2017

Conference tournament champions
- 1998, 1999, 2000, 2001, 2004, 2010, 2016, 2017

Conference regular-season champions
- 1983, 1984, 1985, 1987, 1987, 1988, 1989, 1990, 1991, 1992, 1995, 1998, 1999, 2000, 2002, 2003, 2016, 2017

Uniforms
Home	Away

The Kentucky Wesleyan College Panthers men's basketball team represents Kentucky Wesleyan College, a private college located in Owensboro, Kentucky. The Panthers compete in the NCAA Division II as a member of the Great Midwest Athletic Conference (G-MAC), They have won the NCAA Division II tournament eight times, most recently in the year 2001.

Joel Utley was the "Voice of the Panthers" from 1962 to 2022 (including all eight championships), broadcasting a play-by-play of all Wesleyan basketball games on local Owensboro radio station WBIO.

== Conference play ==
Kentucky Wesleyan is a charter member of the G-MAC (Great Midwest Athletic Conference) that will begin active competition in the 2013–2014 academic season with 8 current NCAA Division II members and one institution transitioning from the NAIA, giving the NCAA D 2 conference 9 members in its first season of full activation. KWC will leave the Great Lakes Valley Conference (GLVC) after the 2012–13 academic season. Their basketball team frequently represented the GLVC in the NCAA Division II tournament, winning four national championships in basketball while members of the GLVC. After coming off NCAA probation, the Panthers finished 13–14 in the 2007 season, then participated in the NCAA Division II tournament for five straight seasons from 2008 to 2012, being Regional Runners Up in the 2012 season.

== Division II championship appearances ==
The Panthers advanced to the Division II championship game six consecutive years (1998–2003), winning in 1999 and 2001; the team later forfeited its 2003 runner-up status after it was revealed they had played two ineligible transfer players.

In addition, they won six other championships (1966, 1968, 1969, 1973, 1987, and 1990) and were runners-up in 1957. Overall, Kentucky Wesleyan has won eight NCAA Division II national men's basketball championships, which is the most by any NCAA Division II School.

== Notable players ==
=== Retired numbers ===
Eight Panthers have had their numbers retired. Seven are for players and one was retired for team physician Dr. William McManus, who worked for the team for 29 years (1965–1994).

Kentucky Wesleyan Panthers retired jerseys
No.	Player	Career
10	Rod Drake	1981–1984
22	Dallas Thornton	1964–1968
23	Corey Crowder	1987–1991
24	Dwight Higgs	1981–1984
29	Dr. William McManus	1965–1994
45	Kelly Coleman	1958–1960
50	George Tinsley	1966–1969
75	Fairce Woods	1946–1949

Three Kentucky Wesleyan basketball players played in the American Basketball Association: George Tinsley, Sam Smith, and Dallas Thornton. One Kentucky Wesleyan basketball player has played in the National Basketball Association: Corey Crowder, who had been a key member of the 1990 NCAA Division II National Championship team. Crowder played two seasons in the NBA for the Utah Jazz (1991–92) and the San Antonio Spurs (1994–95). He would later play fourteen seasons in Italy, Spain, France and Israel. Crowder was a three-time All-American performer, newcomer of the year in the GLVC, two-time GLVC "Player of the Year" and the 1991 NABC "Player of The Year" in Division II, which helped get him elected to the Great Lakes Valley Conference Hall of Fame in 2002. Dazmond Starke 2012–2013, led NCAA Division II in Field goal percentage with 67.4%.

=== Panthers in international leagues ===
- Mohamed Abu Arisha (born 1997), Israeli basketball player for Hapoel Be'er Sheva of the Israeli Basketball Premier League and the Israeli national basketball team

== History ==
Overall
Years of basketball	105
First season	1907
Head coaches (all-time)	21
All Games
All-time record	1582–780
20+ win seasons	34
30+ win seasons	6
Home Games
Owensboro Sports Center	?-?
Winchester, Kentucky	?-?
Great Lakes Valley Conference Games
GLVC Record	430–157
GLVC regular season championships	16 (1983, 1984, 1985, 1987, 1987, 1988, 1989, 1990, 1991, 1992, 1995, 1998, 1999, 2000, 2002, 2003, 2010)
GLVC tournament championships	(1998, 1999, 2000, 2001, 2004, 2010)
NCAA Division II Tournament
NCAA Div II Appearances	38
NCAA W-L record	98–32
Regional Final/Sweet Sixteen	25 (1957, 1960, 1967, 1968, 1969, 1970, 1971, 1973, 1974, 1982, 1983, 1984, 1985, 1987, 1988, 1989, 1990, 1992, 1998, 1999, 2000, 2001, 2002, 2003*, 2012)
Elite Eight	20 (1957, 1960, 1967, 1968, 1969, 1971, 1973, 1982, 1984, 1985, 1987, 1989, 1990, 1992, 1998, 1999, 2000, 2001, 2002, 2003*)
Fourth Place	1 (1971)
Third Place	3 (1960, 1967, 1982)
Final Four	2 (1984, 1985)
Runner-up	5 (1957, 1998, 2000, 2002, 2003*
NCAA Championships	8 (1966, 1968, 1969, 1973, 1987, 1990, 1999, 2001)
*VACATED

== Season-by-season results ==
The following is a list of Kentucky Wesleyan Panthers men's basketball seasons, with records and notable accomplishments

Statistics overview
Season	Team	Overall	Conference	Standing	Postseason
V.I. Moore (Independent) (1907–1910)
1906–07	V.I. Moore	0–1			
1907–08	V.I. Moore	0–1			
1908–09	V.I. Moore	2–1			
1909–10	V.I. Moore	5–3			
V.I. Moore:		7–6			
Unknown (Independent) (1910–1916)
1910–11	Kentucky Wesleyan	4–1			
1911–12	Kentucky Wesleyan	N/A			
1912–13	Kentucky Wesleyan	N/A			
1913–14	Kentucky Wesleyan	0–6			
1914–15	Kentucky Wesleyan	2–1			
1915–16	Kentucky Wesleyan	0–6			
Unknown:		6–14			
John Cobb (Independent) (1916–1917)
1916–17	John Cobb	5–1			
John Cobb:		5–1			
Unknown (Independent) (1917–1919)
1917–18	Kentucky Wesleyan	6–7			
1918–19	Kentucky Wesleyan	0–7			
Unknown:		6–14			
William E. Arnold (Independent) (1919–1920)
1919–20	William E. Arnold	11–3			
William E. Arnold:		11–3			
Jesse Sibley (Independent) (1920–1922)
1920–21	Jesse Sibley	7–7			
1921–22	Jesse Sibley	5–4			
Jesse Sibley:		12–11			
Basil Hayden (Independent) (1922–1923)
1922–23	Basil Hayden	8–1			
Basil Hayden:		8–1			
L.G. Mansfield (Independent) (1923–1924)
1923–24	L.G. Mansfield	10–6			
L.G. Mansfield:		10–6			
C.A. Webb (Independent) (1924–1928)
1924–25	C.A. Webb	13–5			
1925–26	C.A. Webb	17–6			
1926–27	C.A. Webb	9–6			
C.A. Webb:		39–17			
E.R. Miller (Independent) (1927–1928)
1927–28	E.R. Miller	6–12			
E.R. Miller:		6–12			
Walter "Rip" Van Winkle (Independent) (1928–1932)
1928–29	Walter "Rip" Van Winkle	14–7			
1929–30	Walter "Rip" Van Winkle	17–9			
1930–31	Walter "Rip" Van Winkle	12–7			
1931–32	Walter "Rip" Van Winkle	6–11			
Walter "Rip" Van Winkle:		49–34			
George Ditto (Independent) (1932–1941)
1932–33	George Ditto	8–9			
1933–34	George Ditto	4–12			
1934–35	George Ditto	8–9			
1935–36	George Ditto	8–13			
1936–37	George Ditto	8–8			
1937–38	George Ditto	8–9			
1938–39	George Ditto	3–13			
1939–40	George Ditto	3–12			
1940–41	George Ditto	9–7			
George Ditto:		59–92			
Arthur Gullette (Independent) (1941–1942)
1941–42	Arthur Gullette	10–9			
Arthur Gullette:		10–9			
Robert "Bullet" Wilson (Independent) (1942–1957)
1942–43	Robert "Bullet" Wilson	9–5			
1943–44	Robert "Bullet" Wilson	N/A			
1944–45	Robert "Bullet" Wilson	N/A			
1945–46	Robert "Bullet" Wilson	8–10			
1946–47	Robert "Bullet" Wilson	11–9			
1947–48	Robert "Bullet" Wilson	13–12			
1948–49	Robert "Bullet" Wilson	13–14			
1949–50	Robert "Bullet" Wilson	13–10			
1950–51	Robert "Bullet" Wilson	16–7			
1951–52	Robert "Bullet" Wilson	16–7			
1952–53	Robert "Bullet" Wilson	12–10			
1953–54	Robert "Bullet" Wilson	17–10			
1954–55	Robert "Bullet" Wilson	14–10			
1955–56	Robert "Bullet" Wilson	18–4			
1956–57	Robert "Bullet" Wilson	16–12			NCAA Div II Runner-up
Robert "Bullet" Wilson (Independent, Division 1) (1957–1958)
1957–58	Robert "Bullet" Wilson	14–10			
Robert "Bullet" Wilson (Independent, Division 2) (1958–1959)
1958–59	Robert "Bullet" Wilson	14–11			
Robert "Bullet" Wilson:		204–141			
T. L. Plain (Independent) (1959–1963)
1959–60	T. L. Plain	18–11			NCAA Div II Third Place
1960–61	T. L. Plain	15–8			NCAA Div II first round
1961–62	T. L. Plain	21–4			
1962–63	T. L. Plain	9–11			
T.L. Plain:		63–34			
Guy R. Strong (Independent) (1963–1967)
1963–64	Guy R. Strong	15–8			NCAA Div II first round
1964–65	Guy R. Strong	9–12			
1965–66	Guy R. Strong	24–6			NCAA Div II Champion
1966–67	Guy R. Strong	25–4			NCAA Div II Third Place
Guy R. Strong:		73–30			
Bob Daniels (Independent) (1967–1972)
1967–68	Bob Daniels	28–3			NCAA Div II Champion
1968–69	Bob Daniels	28–5			NCAA Div II Champion
1969–70	Bob Daniels	18–10			NCAA Div II Regional Final
1970–71	Bob Daniels	22–8			NCAA Div II Fourth Place
1971–72	Bob Daniels	17–10			NCAA Div II Round of 32
Bob Daniels:		110–36			
Bob Jones (Independent) (1972–1978)
1972–73	Bob Jones	24–6			NCAA Div II Champion
1973–74	Bob Jones	20–6			NCAA Div II Regional Final
1974–75	Bob Jones	12–13			
1975–76	Bob Jones	14–11			
1976–77	Bob Jones	11–14			
1977–78	Bob Jones	14–11			
Bob Jones (Great Lakes Valley Conference) (1978–1980)
1978–79	Bob Jones	12–14	2–6	5th	
1979–80	Bob Jones	12–15	4–6	4th	
Bob Jones:		119–90	6–12		
Mike Pollio (Great Lakes Valley Conference) (1980–1985)
1980–81	Mike Pollio	16–12	7–4	2nd	
1981–82	Mike Pollio	27–5	9–3	2nd	NCAA Div II Third Place
1982–83	Mike Pollio	22–8	10–2	1st	NCAA Div II Regional Final
1983–84	Mike Pollio	28–3	10–2	1st	NCAA Div II Third Place
1984–85	Mike Pollio	24–7	10–4	1st-T	NCAA Div II Third Place
Mike Pollio:		117–35	46–15		
Wayne Chapman (Great Lakes Valley Conference) (1985–1990)
1985–86	Wayne Chapman	22–8	12–4	2nd	NCAA Div II first round
1986–87	Wayne Chapman	28–5	13–3	1st	NCAA Div II Champion
1987–88	Wayne Chapman	23–7	12–4	1st-T	NCAA Div II Regional Final
1988–89	Wayne Chapman	24–7	13–3	1st	NCAA Div II Elite Eight
1989–90	Wayne Chapman	31–2	16–2	1st	NCAA Div II Champion
Wayne Chapman:		128–29	66–16		
Wayne Boultinghouse (Great Lakes Valley Conference) (1990–1996)
1990–91	Wayne Boultinghouse	22–8	14–4	1st-T	NCAA Div II first round
1991–92	Wayne Boultinghouse	23–8	13–5	1st-T	NCAA Div II Elite Eight
1992–93	Wayne Boultinghouse	21–6	13–5	3rd	
1993–94	Wayne Boultinghouse	23–7	13–5	2nd	NCAA Div II Regional semifinal
1994–95	Wayne Boultinghouse	23–6	16–2	1st-T	NCAA Div II first round
1995–96	Wayne Boultinghouse	17–10	13–7	4th	
Wayne Boultinghouse:		129–45	82–28		
Ray Harper (Great Lakes Valley Conference) (1996–2005)
1996–97	Ray Harper	21–8	14–6	5th	
1997–98	Ray Harper	30–3	17–2	1st	NCAA Div II Runner-up
1998–99	Ray Harper	35–2	20–2	1st	NCAA Div II Champion
1999–00	Ray Harper	31–3	18–2	1st	NCAA Div II Runner-up
2000–01	Ray Harper	30–3	17–3	2nd	NCAA Div II Champion
2001–02	Ray Harper	0-3; 31–3 (Note: 20 wins and 5 losses were vacated from the 2003–04 season and for the 2002–03 season the school had to vacate their NCAA Tournament Appearance, the 5 games of the NCAA tournament, (including their NCAA Div II Runner-Up), along with the GLVC regular season championship.)	19–1	1st	NCAA Div II Runner-up
2002–03	Ray Harper	0-4; 26–3'	18–2	1st	NCAA Div II Runner-up
2003–04	Ray Harper	2-8; 22–8	14–6	3rd	NCAA Div II first round
2004–05	Ray Harper	0-0; 15–12	9–11	6th	
Ray Harper:		150-34; 249–46	146–35		
Todd Lee (Great Lakes Valley Conference) (2005–2013)
2005–06	Todd Lee	7–19	4–15	12th	
2006–07	Todd Lee	13–14	6–13	12th	
2007–08	Todd Lee	28–8	14–5	3rd	NCAA Div II first round
2008–09	Todd Lee	19–9	11–7	5th	NCAA Div II first round
2009–10	Todd Lee	29–5	16–2	1st	NCAA Div II first round
2010–11	Todd Lee	19–10	10–8	5th	NCAA Div II first round
2011–12	Todd Lee	23–8	12–6	6th	NCAA Div II Regional Final
2012–13	Todd Lee	20–8	11–7	7th	
Todd Lee:		154–81	84–63		
Happy Osborne (Great Midwest Athletic Conference) (2013–2017)
2013–14	Happy Osborne	22–9	12–2	2nd	
2014–15	Happy Osborne	22–8	10–4	2nd	
2015–16	Happy Osborne	27–4	11–1	1st	NCAA Div II first round
2016–17	Happy Osborne	28–3	12–0	1st	NCAA Div II first round
2017–18	Happy Osborne Jason Mays (Interim)	15–16	9–11	8th	
Happy Osborne:		102–28	45–7		
Jason Mays:		12–12	9–11		
Drew Cooper (Great Midwest Athletic Conference) (2018–present)
2018–19	Drew Cooper	10–16	8–12	9th	
2019–20	Drew Cooper	13–16	9–9	6th	
2020–21	Drew Cooper	10–6	9–5	4th	
2021–22	Drew Cooper	14–14	9–11	7th	
2022–23	Drew Cooper	15–14	11–9	8th	
2023–24	Drew Cooper	21–9	15–5	1st	NCAA Div II first round
Drew Cooper:		62–66	46–46		
Total:		1630–853–1			
National champion Postseason invitational champion Conference regular season champion Conference regular season and conference tournament champion Division regular season champion Division regular season and conference tournament champion Conference tournament champion
