= Ed Smallwood =

American basketball player

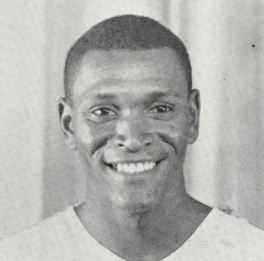
- Smallwood as a junior at Evansville

Personal information
- Born: June 4, 1937 Louisville, Kentucky, U.S.
- Died: November 6, 2002 (aged 65) Evansville, Indiana, U.S.
- Listed height: 6 ft 4 in (1.93 m)
- Listed weight: 200 lb (91 kg)

Career information
- High school: Central (Louisville, Kentucky)
- College: Evansville (1957–1960)
- NBA draft: 1960: 13th round, 88th overall pick
- Drafted by: St. Louis Hawks
- Position: Power forward

Career highlights
- 2× NCAA College Division champion (1959, 1960); 2× NCAA College Division Tournament MVP (1958, 1960); Consensus first-team College Division All-American (1960); 2× Second-team College Division All-American – UPI (1958, 1959); 2× ICC Player of the Year (1959, 1960); 3× First-team All-ICC (1958–1960); No. 40 jersey retired by Evansville Purple Aces
- Stats at Basketball Reference
Medals
Men's basketball
Representing United States
Pan American Games
Gold medal – first place	1963 São Paulo	Team competition

Edgar Malcolm Smallwood (June 4, 1937 – November 6, 2002) was an American basketball player. He was known for his college career for Evansville College (now the University of Evansville), where he led the program to two NCAA College Division national championships. Smallwood also represented the United States in the 1963 Pan American Games where the team won the gold medal.

== Life and career ==
Smallwood came to Evansville from Central High School in Louisville, Kentucky. A 6'4 power forward known for his jump shooting and rebounding prowess, Smallwood would prove to be a significant player for the Purple Aces. In his first varsity season in 1957–58, Smallwood led the team to the College Division Final Four for the first time in program history. While the Purple Aces fell to Saint Michael's College in the semifinal, Smallwood scored a tournament high 41 points in the consolation game against Wheaton and earned tournament Most Valuable Player honors. The nest two seasons, Evansville returned to the Final Four, but on both occasions were able to capture the national championship. Smallwood repeated as MVP of the 1960 tournament as the Purple Aces defeated Chapman College for the title. In both of his final seasons Smallwood captured individual small college All-America honors.

He finished his career with 1,898 points (23.1 per game) and 981 rebounds (11.9 per game), both of which were school records at the time.

Following his college career, Smallwood was drafted by the St. Louis Hawks in the 1960 NBA draft, but did not make the team. He then joined the Army and played for the Armed Forces team, which helped him secure a spot on the United States team for the 1963 Pan American Games in São Paulo, Brazil. Once in Brazil, Smallwood's eligibility was questioned, but resolved once the Hawks confirmed that he had not been paid to play basketball. The team went 6–0 to win the gold medal with Smallwood's best game coming in the second round against Canada, where he scored 14 points. After his time in the service, he settled in Evansville.

Smallwood died in Evansville on November 6, 2002, at age 65.

Smallwood's legacy as a player has led to his induction into the University of Evansville's Athletic Hall of Fame and the Small College Basketball Hall of Fame. In 2009, Evansville retired his #40 jersey.
