= 1952–53 Drexel Dragons men's basketball team =

Team representing Drexel Institute of Technology

1952–53 Drexel Dragons men's basketball
- Conference: Middle Atlantic Conferences
- Southern
- Record: 9–8 (6–4 MAC)
- Head coach: Samuel Cozen (1st season)
- Captain: Dan Promislo
- Home arena: Sayre High School, Curtis Hall Gym

The 1952–53 Drexel Dragons men's basketball team represented Drexel Institute of Technology during the 1952–53 men's basketball season. The Dragons, led by 1st year head coach Samuel Cozen, played their 6 of their home games at Sayre High School, and the other 3 at Curtis Hall Gym, and were members of the Southern division of the Middle Atlantic Conferences (MAC).

== Roster ==
1952–53 Drexel Dragons men's basketball team
Players
Coaches

Pos.	#	Name	Height	Weight	Year	Previous school	Hometown
G	8	Edward Roman	6 ft 2 in (1.88 m)	—
F	10	Arthur Jones	—	—
F	11	J. Richard Walker	—	—
C	17	Dan Promislo (C)	—	—
G		Edward Imparato	—	—
F		Karl Schaeffer	6 ft 4 in (1.93 m)	—
G		George Seidel	5 ft 11 in (1.8 m)	—
G		Victor Quattrini	—	—
		Robert Ranonis	—	—
		Harry Sarajian	—	—
		Joseph Scafaria	—	—
		Stanton Woerth	—	—
		Richard McGarrity	—	—
		George McGorman	—	—
		Edwin Neuman	—	—

Head coach

- Samuel Cozen (Temple)

Assistant coach(es)

Legend

- (C) Team captain
- (S) Suspended
- (I) Ineligible
- (W) Walk-on
- Injured
- Current redshirt

Roster

== Schedule ==
Date time, TV	Rank^{#}	Opponent^{#}	Result	Record	High points	High rebounds	High assists	Site (attendance) city, state
Regular season
January 3, 1953*		at Rutgers–Camden	L 53–59	0–1	–	–	–	Gloucester High School; Gloucester, NJ
January 7, 1953*		Philadelphia Textile	W 80–50	1–1	–	–	–	Sayre High School; Philadelphia, PA
January 10, 1953		Delaware	L 64–81	1–2 (0–1)	14 – Promislo	–	–	Sayre High School; Philadelphia, PA
January 14, 1953		Ursinus	W 74–59	2–2 (1–1)	–	–	–	Sayre High School; Philadelphia, PA
January 17, 1953		at Pennsylvania Military College	L 56–71	2–3 (1–2)	–	–	–	Chester, PA
January 19, 1953*		Philadelphia Pharmacy	W 104–83	3–3	25 – Promislo	–	–	Curtis Hall Gym; Philadelphia, PA
January 24, 1953*		West Chester	W 78–60	4–3	19 – Promislo	18 – Promislo	–	Convention Hall; Philadelphia, PA
January 28, 1953*		Temple	L 56–61	4–4	–	–	–	Sayre High School; Philadelphia, PA
January 31, 1953*		Drexel Alumni	W 79–74		–	–	–	Curtis Hall Gym; Philadelphia, PA
February 3, 1953*		at Franklin & Marshall	L 63–82	4–5	21 – Promislo	–	–	Lancaster, PA
February 7, 1953		Swarthmore	W 71–64	5–5 (2–2)	22 – Roman	–	–	Sayre High School; Philadelphia, PA
February 11, 1953		Haverford	W 78–57	6–5 (3–2)	20 – Promislo	–	–	Sayre High School; Philadelphia, PA
February 14, 1953*		vs. Saint Joseph's	L 58–88	6–6	15 – Roman	–	–	Convention Hall; Philadelphia, PA
February 18, 1953		at Urinus	W 62–52	7–6 (4–2)	16 – Tied	–	–	
February 21, 1953		at Delaware	L 61–63	7–7 (4–3)	18 – Walker	–	–	Newark, DE
February 25, 1953		at Swarthmore	W 71–69	8–7 (5–3)	–	–	–	
February 28, 1953		at Haverford	W 72–62	9–7 (6–3)	27 – Walker	–	–	Ryan Gym; Haverford, PA
March 4, 1953		Pennsylvania Military College	L 39–69	9–8 (6–4)	–	–	–	Saint Joseph's Fieldhouse; Philadelphia, PA
*Non-conference game. ^{#}Rankings from AP. (#) Tournament seedings in parentheses. All times are in Eastern Time.
