= 1967–68 Drexel Dragons men's basketball team =

American college basketball season

1967–68 Drexel Dragons men's basketball
- Conference: Middle Atlantic Conferences
- College–Southern
- Record: 12–9 (9–5 MAC)
- Head coach: Samuel Cozen, Robert Morgan
- Home arena: Sayre High School

The 1967–68 Drexel Dragons men's basketball team represented Drexel Institute of Technology during the 1967–68 men's basketball season. The Dragons, led by 16th year head coach Samuel Cozen, played their home games at Sayre High School and were members of the College–Southern division of the Middle Atlantic Conferences (MAC).

Cozen stepped down from the head coach position during the season on January 31 due to medial issues. The team was 10–2 at time. He was replaced by interim head coach Robert Morgan who finished the season 2–7 as the head coach.

The team finished the season 12–9.

== Roster ==
1967–68 Drexel Dragons men's basketball team
Players	Coaches
Pos. / # / Name / Height / Weight / Year / Previous school / Hometown; / / / — / —	Head coach: Samuel Cozen (Temple); Robert Morgan; Assistant coach(es) Legend: (C) Team captain; (S) Suspended; (I) Ineligible; (W) Walk-on; Injured; Current redshirt

== Schedule ==
Date time, TV	Rank^{#}	Opponent^{#}	Result	Record	High points	High rebounds	High assists	Site (attendance) city, state
Regular season
Unknown		Delaware Valley	W 72–70	1–0 (1–0)	–	–	–	
Unknown		Upsala	W 67–60	2–0 (2–0)	–	–	–	
December 16, 1967		Swarthmore	W 76–60	3–0 (3–0)	–	–	–	Sayre High School; Philadelphia, PA
Unknown*		Kutztown ? semifinal	W 65–58	4–0	–	–	–	
Unknown*		Wilkes ? championship	W 69–68	5–0	–	–	–	
Unknown*		Delaware	L 56–67	5–1	–	–	–	
Unknown		Muhlenberg	W 83–70	6–1 (4–0)	–	–	–	
January 9, 1968		at Lebanon Valley	L 85–91	6–2 (4–1)	–	–	–	
Unknown*		West Chester	W 81–68	7–2	–	–	–	
January 16, 1968		at Swarthmore	W 53–48	8–2 (5–1)	–	–	–	
Unknown		Moravian	W 59–55	9–2 (6–1)	–	–	–	
Unknown		Pennsylvania Military College	W 70–56	10–2 (7–1)	–	–	–	
Unknown*		Rider	L 54–65	10–3	–	–	–	
Unknown*		Delaware	L 77–94	10–4	–	–	–	
February 7, 1968		at Haverford	L 65–67	10–5 (7–2)	–	–	–	Haverford, PA
February 9, 1968		vs. Johns Hopkins	W 66–55	11–5 (8–2)	–	–	–	Palestra; Philadelphia, PA
Unknown		Wagner	L 78–80	11–6 (8–3)	26 – Linderman	–	–	Philadelphia, PA
Unknown		at Scranton	L 65–82	11–7 (8–4)	–	–	–	Scranton, PA
Unknown		at Ursinus	W 57–55	12–7 (9–4)	–	–	–	Collegeville, PA
Unknown		at Franklin & Marshall	L 73–79	12–8 (9–5)	–	–	–	Lancaster, PA
1968 Middle Atlantic Conference men's basketball tournament
March 1, 1968; 7:00 pm	(2)	vs. (1) Ursinus; Semifinal	L 55–65	12–9	–	–	–	Allentown, PA
*Non-conference game. ^{#}Rankings from AP. (#) Tournament seedings in parentheses. All times are in Eastern Time.
