= 1963–64 Drexel Dragons men's basketball team =

American college basketball season

1963–64 Drexel Dragons men's basketball

MAC College–Southern Regular Season Champions
- Conference: Middle Atlantic Conferences
- College–Southern
- Record: 17–5 (12–2 MAC)
- Head coach: Samuel Cozen (12th season)
- Home arena: Sayre High School

The 1963–64 Drexel Dragons men's basketball team represented Drexel Institute of Technology during the 1963–64 men's basketball season. The Dragons, led by 12th year head coach Samuel Cozen, played their home games at Sayre High School and were members of the College–Southern division of the Middle Atlantic Conferences (MAC).

== Roster ==
1963–64 Drexel Dragons men's basketball team
Players
Coaches

Pos.	#	Name	Height	Weight	Year	Previous school	Hometown
	34	Bob Ferguson	6 ft 2 in (1.88 m)	—	So
	53	Ron Forys	6 ft 5 in (1.96 m)	—	So
		Mike McCurdy	—	—	Jr
		Denny Sarafinas	—	—	So
			—	—

Head coach

- Samuel Cozen (Temple)

Assistant coach(es)

Legend

- (C) Team captain
- (S) Suspended
- (I) Ineligible
- (W) Walk-on
- Injured
- Current redshirt

== Schedule ==
Date time, TV	Rank^{#}	Opponent^{#}	Result	Record	High points	High rebounds	High assists	Site (attendance) city, state
Regular season
December 7, 1963*; 2:00 pm		Delaware Valley	W 105–62	1–0	28 – Sarafinas	15 – Sarafinas	–	Sayre High School; Philadelphia, PA
December 21, 1963		Upsala	W 69–59	2–0 (1–0)	20 – Seraflnas	–	–	Sayre High School; Philadelphia, PA
December 28, 1963*		vs. Detroit Tech; Rochester Technical College Tournament Quarterfinals	W 83–43	3–0	–	–	–	Rochester, NY
December 29, 1963*		vs. Pratt; Rochester Technical College Tournament Semifinals	W 74–55	4–0	18 – Forys	16 – Forys	–	Rochester, NY
December 30, 1963*		vs. Indiana Tech; Rochester Technical College Tournament Championship	L 55–84	4–1	–	–	–	Rochester, NY
January 4, 1964		Pennsylvania Military College	W 79–49	5–1 (2–0)	22 – McCurdy	–	–	Sayre High School; Philadelphia, PA
January 6, 1964		at Swarthmore	W 76–53	6–1 (3–0)	15 – McCurdy	15 – Stanton	–	
January 8, 1964		at Haverford	W 70–49	7–1 (4–0)	17 – Forys	15 – Ferguson	–	Haverford, PA
January 11, 1964		Muhlenberg	W 84–62	8–1 (5–0)	–	–	–	Sayre High School; Philadelphia, PA
January 18, 1964; 3:30 pm		West Chester	L 52–59	8–2 (5–1)	–	–	–	Sayre High School; Philadelphia, PA
January 20, 1964; 8:30 pm		Ursinus	W 74–65	9–2 (6–1)	16 – Forys	18 – Ferguson	–	Sayre High School; Philadelphia, PA
February 1, 1964; 3:30 pm		at Franklin & Marshall	W 73–39	10–2 (7–1)	16 – Forys	15 – Ferguson	–	Lancaster, PA
February 5, 1964; 8:30 pm		Swarthmore	W 52–38	11–2 (8–1)	12 – Ferguson	–	–	Sayre High School; Philadelphia, PA
February 8, 1964; 2:30 pm		at Pennsylvania Military College	W 66–46	12–2 (9–1)	21 – Forys	–	–	
February 12, 1964; 8:30 pm		Haverford	W 88–47	13–2 (10–1)	–	–	–	Sayre High School; Philadelphia, PA
February 14, 1964*; 9:15 pm		vs. Rider	W 59–54	14–2	18 – Ferguson	–	–	Palestra; Philadelphia, PA
February 16, 1964; 3:30 pm		Johns Hopkins	W 66–49	15–2 (11–1)	–	–	–	Sayre High School; Philadelphia, PA
February 19, 1964*; 8:15 pm		at Delaware	L 54–68	15–3	16 – McCurdy	–	–	Carpenter Sports Building; Newark, DE
February 21, 1964; 8:15 pm		at Lebanon Valley	L 65–66	15–4 (11–2)	23 – McCurdy	–	–	
February 22, 1964; 8:30 pm		at Ursinus	W 83–68	16–4 (12–2)	–	–	–	
1964 Middle Atlantic Conference men's basketball tournament
February 28, 1964; 7:00 pm		vs. No. 5 Hofstra; College Division Semifinals	W 62–58	17–4	16 – Ferguson	–	–	Bethlehem, PA
February 29, 1964		vs. Elizabethtown; College Division Championship	L 52–59	17–5	15 – McCurdy	–	–	Bethlehem, PA
*Non-conference game. ^{#}Rankings from AP. (#) Tournament seedings in parentheses. All times are in Eastern Time.
