= Drew Cooper =

American college basketball coach

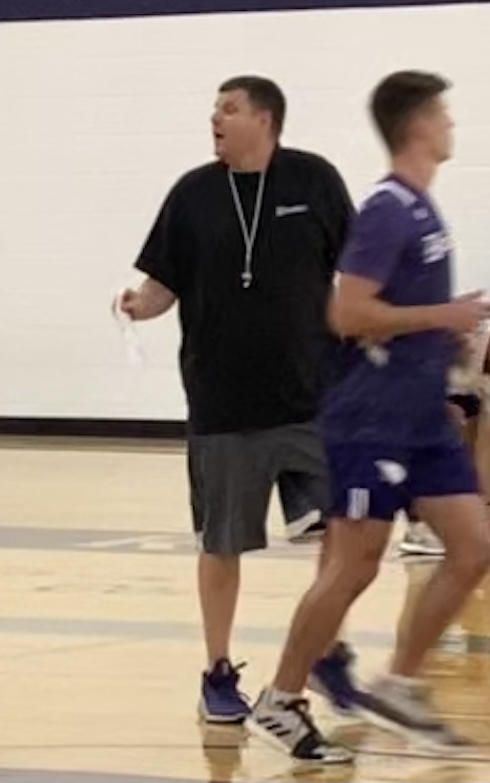
- Cooper at an open practice for Kentucky Wesleyan in 2019

Current position
- Title: Head coach
- Team: Kentucky Wesleyan
- Conference: G-MAC
- Record: 33–38

Biographical details
- Born: Louisville, Kentucky, U.S.

Playing career
- 1995–1999: Assumption

Coaching career (HC unless noted)
- 2001–2002: Bellarmine (assistant)
- 2002–2003: Northern Kentucky (assistant)
- 2003–2006: Babson (assistant)
- 2006–2007: Wheelock
- 2007–2013: Bellarmine (assistant)
- 2013–2018: Thomas More
- 2018–present: Kentucky Wesleyan

Head coaching record
- Overall: 127–83
- Tournaments: 0–2 (NCAA Division III)

Accomplishments and honors

Championships
- 2 PAC tournament (2017, 2018)

Records
- 2x PAC Coach of the Year (2017, 2018)

Drew Cooper is an American college basketball coach. He is currently the head coach of the Kentucky Wesleyan Panthers men's basketball team.
