= George Tinsley =

American basketball player (born 1946)

Personal information
- Born: September 19, 1946 (age 80) Louisville, Kentucky, U.S.
- Listed height: 6 ft 5 in (1.96 m)
- Listed weight: 205 lb (93 kg)

Career information
- High school: Male (Louisville, Kentucky)
- College: Kentucky Wesleyan (1965–1969)
- NBA draft: 1969: 6th round, 76th overall pick
- Drafted by: Chicago Bulls
- Playing career: 1969–1972
- Position: Small forward
- Number: 31, 34, 44

Career history
- 1969: Washington Caps
- 1969–1970: Kentucky Colonels
- 1970–1971: Decatur Bullets
- 1971–1972: The Floridians

Career highlights
- 3× NCAA Division II champion (1966, 1968, 1969); NCAA Division II Tournament MOP (1969); 2× Division II All-American (1968, 1969); No. 50 retired by Kentucky Wesleyan Panthers

Career statistics
- Points: 704 (5.3 ppg)
- Rebounds: 385 (2.9 rpg)
- Assists: 114 (0.9 apg)
- Stats at Basketball Reference

George T. Tinsley (born September 19, 1946) is an American former basketball player who played two seasons in the American Basketball Association (ABA).

== Background ==
Born in Louisville, Kentucky, Tinsley played competitively at Male High School and college basketball at Kentucky Wesleyan College, where he was a member of the teams that won the NCAA Men's Division II Basketball Championship in 1966, 1968 and 1969, being named Most Outstanding Player in 1969. Tinsley was also a two time All American at Kentucky Wesleyan.

== Basketball career ==
Tinsley was selected in the sixth round of the 1969 NBA draft by the Chicago Bulls and in the 1969 ABA Draft by the Oakland Oaks.

Tinsley ended up playing with the Kentucky Colonels during the 1969–70 ABA season, averaging 6.3 points and 4.0 rebounds per game in 83 regular season games. Tinsley averaged 9.5 points per game and 5.3 rebounds per game for the Colonels in 12 games of the 1970 ABA Playoffs, as the Colonels defeated the New York Nets in the Eastern Division Semifinals and lost to the Indiana Pacers in the Eastern Division Finals. He signed with the Decatur Bullets of the Continental Basketball Association on December 30, 1970.

Tinsley then played for The Floridians during the 1971–72 ABA season, averaging 3.7 points and 1.2 rebounds per game in the regular season and 2.0 points per game in the 1972 ABA Playoffs as the Floridians lost in the Eastern Division Semifinals to the Virginia Squires. Tinsley was selected by the New York Nets in the 1972 dispersal draft of Floridians players upon the franchise's dissolution, but he did not play for the Nets.

== Business career ==
Tinsley was later a successful businessman with Kentucky Fried Chicken and was inducted into the Kentucky Wesleyan College Alumni Hall of Fame.
