= 1973 NCAA College Division basketball tournament =

Edition of USA college basketball tournament

- Teams: 42
- Finals site: , Evansville, Indiana
- Champions: Kentucky Wesleyan Panthers (4th title)
- Runner-up: Tennessee State Tigers (2nd title game)
- Semifinalists: Assumption Greyhounds (1st Final Four); Brockport State Golden Eagles (1st Final Four)
- Winning coach: Bob Jones (1st title)
- MOP: Mike Williams (Kentucky Wesleyan)
- Attendance: 18,318

The 1973 NCAA College Division basketball tournament involved 42 schools playing in a single-elimination tournament to determine the national champion of men's NCAA College Division basketball as a culmination of the 1972-73 NCAA College Division men's basketball season. It was won by Kentucky Wesleyan College and Kentucky Wesleyan's Mike Williams was the Most Outstanding Player.

This was the last College Division basketball tournament. Effective with the next school year of 1973–74, the NCAA adopted the three-division setup that exists to this day. The top-level University Division was renamed Division I, while the College Division was split in two. College Division members that wished to award athletic scholarships were placed in Division II, while those that chose to remain non-scholarship were placed in Division III.

1973 NCAA Division II Men's sites - first round (white) regionals (cyan) Elite Eight (red)

}

== Regional participants ==
School	Outcome
Coe	Regional Champion
South Dakota State	Runner-up
Southern Colorado	Fourth Place
SW Missouri State	Third Place

School	Outcome
Assumption	Regional Champion
Bentley	Runner-up
Bridgeport	Third Place
Hartford	Fifth Place*
St. Michael's	Fourth Place
Stonehill	Fifth Place*

School	Outcome
Akron	Regional Champion
Cheyney	Third Place
Hiram	Fifth Place*
Lebanon Valley	Fifth Place*
Philadelphia Textile	Fourth Place
Steubenville	Runner-up

School	Outcome
Albany State	Fifth Place
Chattanooga	Third Place
SE Louisiana	Runner-up
Tennessee State	Regional Champion
Transylvania	Fourth Place

School	Outcome
Capital	Third Place
Kentucky Wesleyan	Regional Champion
Valparaiso	Runner-up
Wooster	Fourth Place

School	Outcome
Eckerd	Fifth Place*
Fayetteville State	Third Place
Loyola (MD)	Fourth Place
Old Dominion	Runner-up
Roanoke	Regional Champion
St. Thomas	Fifth Place*

School	Outcome
Brockport State	Regional Champion
C. W. Post	Third Place
Hartwick	Runner-up
New Jersey City	Fifth Place*
Potsdam State	Fourth Place
RPI	Fifth Place*

School	Outcome
Cal State Bakersfield	Runner-up
Puget Sound	Fourth Place
San Diego	Third Place
Sonoma State	Fifth Place
UC Riverside	Regional Champion

*denotes tie

== Regionals ==
=== Midwest - Springfield, Missouri ===
Location: McDonald Hall and Arena Host: Southwest Missouri State University

Regional semifinals Round of 32; March 9
Coe	65
Southern Colorado	63
South Dakota State	85
SW Missouri State	74

Regional Final; Sweet 16; March 10
Coe	107
South Dakota State	104

- Third Place - SW Missouri State 76, Southern Colorado 62

=== New England - Worcester, Massachusetts ===
Location: Andrew Laska Gymnasium Host: Assumption College

First round - Hartford, CT; Round of 42; March 6
St. Michael's	108
Hartford	97

First round - Bridgeport, CT; Round of 42; March 6
Bridgeport	77
Stonehill	74

Regional semifinals Round of 32; March 9
Assumption	81
St. Michael's	79
Bridgeport	106
Bentley	109***

Regional Final; Sweet 16; March 10
Assumption	87
Bentley	85

- Third Place - Bridgeport 93, St. Michael's 75

=== Mideast - Reading, Pennsylvania ===
Location: Bollman Center Host: Albright College

First round - Chester, PA; Round of 42; March 6
Cheyney	74
Lebanon Valley	56

First round - Akron, OH; Round of 42; March 6
Steubenville	54
Hiram	51

Regional semifinals Round of 32; March 9
Akron	99
Cheyney	71
Steubenville	61
Philadelphia Textile	51

Regional Final; Sweet 16; March 10
Akron	49
Steubenville	47

- Third Place - Cheyney 70, Philadelphia Textile 63

=== South - Hammond, Louisiana ===
Location: Cefalu Coliseum Host: Southeastern Louisiana University

First round - Lexington, KY; Round of 42; March 6
Transylvania	72*
Albany State	71

Regional semifinals Round of 32; March 9
Tennessee State	53
Transylvania	45
SE Louisiana	67
Chattanooga	64

Regional Final; Sweet 16; March 10
Tennessee State	62*
SE Louisiana	54

- Third Place - Chattanooga 99, Transylvania 86

=== Great Lakes - Evansville, Indiana ===
Location: Roberts Municipal Stadium Host: University of Evansville

Regional semifinals Round of 32
Kentucky Wesleyan	93
Wooster	56
Valparaiso	69
Capital	64

Regional Final; Sweet 16
Kentucky Wesleyan	74
Valparaiso	66

- Third Place - Capital 75, Wooster 47

=== South Atlantic - Salem, Virginia ===
Location: C. Homer Bast Center Host: Roanoke College

First round - Fayetteville, NC; Round of 42; March 6
Fayetteville State	95
Eckerd	66

First round - Miami, FL; Round of 42; March 6
Loyola (MD)	82*
St. Thomas	79

Regional semifinals Round of 32; March 8
Old Dominion	80
Fayetteville State	74
Loyola	63
Roanoke	84

Regional Final; Sweet 16; March 9
Old Dominion	87
Roanoke	88*

- Third Place - Fayetteville State 81, Loyola 66

=== East - Oneonta, New York ===
Location: Binder Physical Education Center Host: Hartwick College

First round - sites unknown Round of 42; March 6
Brockport State	78
New Jersey City	68
Potsdam State	54
RPI	52

Regional semifinals Round of 32; March 9
C. W. Post	77
Brockport State	93
Potsdam State	58
Hartwick	75

Regional Final; Sweet 16; March 10
Brockport State	70
Hartwick	62

- Third Place - C. W. Post 79, Potsdam State 75

=== West - Bakersfield, California ===
Location: Bakersfield Civic Auditorium Host: California State College, Bakersfield

First round - Riverside, CA; Round of 42; March 6
UC Riverside	70
Sonoma State	68

Regional semifinals Round of 32; March 9
Puget Sound	51
UC Riverside	71
Cal State Bakersfield	50
San Diego	44

Regional Final; Sweet 16; March 10
UC Riverside	61
Cal State Bakersfield	54

- Third Place - San Diego 80, Puget Sound 73

*denotes each overtime played

== National Finals - Evansville, Indiana ==
Location: Roberts Municipal Stadium Host: University of Evansville

National Quarterfinals; Elite Eight; March 14
Coe	96
Assumption	102
Akron	50
Tennessee State	54
Kentucky Wesleyan	87
Roanoke	63
Brockport State	79
UC Riverside	70

National semifinals Final Four; March 15
Assumption	76
Tennessee State	106
Kentucky Wesleyan	96
Brockport State	90

National Championship; March 16
Tennessee State	76
Kentucky Wesleyan	78*

- Third Place - Assumption 94, Brockport State 90

*denotes each overtime played

== All-tournament team ==
- Mike Boylan (Assumption)
- Ron Gilliam (Brockport State)
- Leonard Robinson (Tennessee State)
- Mike Williams (Kentucky Wesleyan)
- Roger Zornes (Kentucky Wesleyan)

== See also ==
- 1973 NCAA University Division basketball tournament
- 1973 NAIA Basketball Tournament

== Sources ==
- 2010 NCAA Men's Basketball Championship Tournament Records and Statistics: Division II men's basketball Championship
- 1973 NCAA College Division Men's Basketball Tournament jonfmorse.com
