= 1968 NCAA College Division basketball tournament =

Edition of USA college basketball tournament

- Teams: 36
- Finals site: Roberts Municipal Stadium, Evansville, Indiana
- Champions: Kentucky Wesleyan Panthers (2nd title)
- Runner-up: Indiana State Sycamores (1st title game)
- Semifinalists: Trinity (TX) Tigers (1st Final Four); Ashland Eagles (1st Final Four)
- Winning coach: Bob Daniels (1st title)
- MOP: Jerry Newsom (Indiana State)
- Attendance: 33,899

The 1968 NCAA College Division basketball tournament involved 36 schools playing in a single-elimination tournament to determine the national champion of men's NCAA College Division college basketball as a culmination of the 1967–68 NCAA College Division men's basketball season. It was won by Kentucky Wesleyan College, with Indiana State's Jerry Newsom named Most Outstanding Player. Uniquely, Indiana State has finished as the National Runner-up in the (1946 and 1948) NAIA Tournaments, the (1979) NCAA Division I Tournament, and the 1968 NCAA College Division Tournament.

1968 NCAA Division II Men's sites - first 2 rounds (white) regionals (cyan) Elite Eight (red)

== Regional participants ==
School	Outcome
American International	Regional Champion
Assumption	Fifth Place*
Bridgeport	Third Place*
Buffalo State	Runner-up
Le Moyne	Seventh Place*
Northeastern	Fifth Place*
Rochester	Third Place*
Springfield	Seventh Place*

School	Outcome
Bethune–Cookman	Fourth Place
Kentucky Wesleyan	Regional Champion
Oglethorpe	Third Place
Union (TN)	Runner-up

School	Outcome
Cheyney	Regional Champion
Muhlenberg	Fourth Place
Philadelphia Textile	Third Place
Wagner	Runner-up

School	Outcome
Ashland	Regional Champion
Denison	Third Place
Norfolk State	Runner-up
Roanoke	Fourth Place

School	Outcome
Evansville	Regional Champion
Lincoln (MO)	Third Place
Southern Colorado	Fourth Place
SW Missouri State	Runner-up

School	Outcome
Jackson State	Third Place
McNeese State	Fourth Place
Pan American	Runner-up
Trinity (TX)	Regional Champion

School	Outcome
DePauw	Fourth Place
Illinois State	Runner-up
Indiana State	Regional Champion
South Dakota State	Third Place

School	Outcome
Nevada Southern	Regional Champion
San Diego State	Third Place
UC Davis	Fourth Place
UC Irvine	Runner-up

*indicates a tie

== Regionals ==
=== Northeast ===
Locations: Assumption College Gymnasium (Section A), University of Rochester Palestra (Section B) and Henry A. Butova Gymnasium (Regional final)
Hosts: Assumption College (Section A), University of Rochester (Section B) and American International College (Regional final)

First round Round of 36; March 5
Bridgeport	86
Springfield	62
Section A—Worcester, MA
American International	80
Assumption	78
Buffalo State	83
Le Moyne	66
Section B—Rochester, NY
Rochester	75
Northeastern	67

Regional semifinals Round of 32; March 6
Bridgeport	67
American International	77
Buffalo State	79
Rochester	67

Regional Final - Butova Gymnasium, Springfield, MA; Sweet 16; March 8
American International	79
Buffalo State	64

- Consolation- Assumption 94, Springfield 75
- Consolation- Northeastern 67, Le Moyne 54

Notes

- The right to host the regional final was given to team emerging from the games played in Worcester, unless that team was Bridgeport, whose home court was either unavailable or deemed unsuitable to host the regional final.

=== South - Jackson, Tennessee ===
Location: unknown Host: Union University

Regional semifinals Round of 32; March 8
Kentucky Wesleyan	86
Oglethorpe	59
Union (TN)	81
Bethune–Cookman	67

Regional Final; Sweet 16; March 9
Kentucky Wesleyan	66
Union	58

- Third Place - Oglethorpe 82, Bethune-Cookman 70

=== East - Reading, Pennsylvania ===
Location: Bollman Center Host: Cheyney State College

Regional semifinals Round of 32; March 8
Cheyney	94
Muhlenberg	67
Wagner	98
Philadelphia Textile	84

Regional Final; Sweet 16; March 9
Cheyney	72
Wagner	57

- Third Place -Philadelphia Textile 105, Muhlenberg 94

=== Mideast - Ashland, Ohio ===
Location: Kates Gymnasium Host: Ashland University

Regional semifinals Round of 32; March 8
Norfolk State	108
Denison	86
Ashland	71
Roanoke	46

Regional Final; Sweet 16; March 9
Norfolk State	51
Ashland	61

- Third Place - Denison 90, Roanoke 77

=== Midwest - Springfield, Missouri ===
Location: McDonald Hall and Arena Host: Southwest Missouri State University

Regional semifinals Round of 32; March 8
Evansville	95
Lincoln (MO)	80
SW Missouri State	69
Southern Colorado	68

Regional Final; Sweet 16; March 9
Evansville	79
SW Missouri State	73

- Third Place - Lincoln 92, Southern Colorado 77

=== Southwest - Lake Charles, Louisiana ===
Location: Memorial Gym Host: McNeese State University

Regional semifinals Round of 32; March 8
Pan American	96
Jackson State	73
Trinity (TX)	95
McNeese State	78

Regional Final; Sweet 16; March 9
Pan American	83
Trinity (TX)	87*

- Third Place - Jackson State 75, McNeese State 71

=== Great Lakes - Normal, Illinois ===
Location: Horton Field House Host: Illinois State University

Regional semifinals Round of 32; March 8
Indiana State	101
South Dakota State	83
Illinois State	83
DePauw	81

Regional Final; Sweet 16; March 9
Indiana State	98
Illinois State	93

- Third Place - South Dakota State 86, DePauw 84

=== Pacific Coast - San Diego, California ===
Location: Peterson Gym Host: San Diego State College

Regional semifinals Round of 32; March 8
Nevada Southern	96
UC Davis	91
UC Irvine	78
San Diego State	69

Regional Final; Sweet 16; March 9
Nevada Southern	79
UC Irvine	74

- Third Place - San Diego State 79, UC Davis 72

*denotes each overtime played

== National Finals - Evansville, Indiana ==
Location: Roberts Municipal Stadium Host: University of Evansville

National Quarterfinals; Elite Eight; March 13
American International	78
Kentucky Wesleyan	90
Cheyney	30
Ashland	45
Evansville	77
Trinity (TX)	93
Indiana State	94
Nevada Southern	75

National semifinals Final Four; March 14
Kentucky Wesleyan	45
Ashland	32
Trinity (TX)	67
Indiana State	77

National Championship; March 15
Kentucky Wesleyan	63
Indiana State	52

- Third Place - Trinity 68, Ashland 52

*denotes each overtime played

== All-tournament team ==
- Fred Hardman (Indiana State)
- Larry Jeffries (Trinity (TX))
- Jerry Newsom (Indiana State)
- Dallas Thornton (Kentucky Wesleyan)
- George Tinsley (Kentucky Wesleyan)

== See also ==
- 1968 NCAA University Division basketball tournament
- 1968 NAIA Basketball Tournament

== Sources ==
- 2010 NCAA Men's Basketball Championship Tournament Records and Statistics: Division II men's basketball Championship
- 1968 NCAA College Division Men's Basketball Tournament jonfmorse.com
