= Indiana State College Arena =

Multi puropse arena in Terre Haute, Indiana

- Indiana State College Arena
- Interactive map of Indiana State College Arena
- Full name: Indiana State College Arena
- Location: Terre Haute, Indiana
- Coordinates: 39.47088°N 87.41194°W
- Owner: Indiana State University
- Operator: Indiana State University
- Capacity: 5,500

Construction
- Opened: December 1, 1962

Tenant
- Indiana State Sycamores men's basketball (1962–1973)

Indiana State College Arena is a 5,500-seat multi-purpose arena in Terre Haute, Indiana. It was home to the Indiana State University Sycamores basketball team until the Hulman Civic University Center (now known as Hulman Center) opened in 1973. At the time of its construction, the arena's roof was the largest single-span poured cement roof in the world.

It also hosted the university's wrestling and men's and women's gymnastics teams. During the 1961–62 and 1962–63 seasons, the arena was the site of the Interstate Classic Basketball Tournament. Host Indiana State won the tournament in 1962, Western Illinois won the tournament in 1963.

Today, it hosts the women's volleyball team; as well as providing space for the university intramural sports program and classroom and laboratory facilities for the College of Nursing, Health and Human Services. It also provides office space for the university's Intercollegiate Athletic Program.
