= 1966 NCAA College Division basketball tournament =

Edition of USA college basketball tournament

- Teams: 36
- Finals site: Roberts Municipal Stadium, Evansville, Indiana
- Champions: Kentucky Wesleyan Panthers (1st title)
- Runner-up: Southern Illinois Salukis (2nd title game)
- Semifinalists: Akron Zips (2nd Final Four); North Dakota Fighting Sioux (2nd Final Four)
- Winning coach: Guy R. Strong (1st title)
- MOP: Sam Smith (Kentucky Wesleyan)
- Attendance: 26,082

The 1966 NCAA College Division basketball tournament involved 36 schools playing in a single-elimination tournament to determine the national champion of men's NCAA College Division basketball as a culmination of the 1965–66 NCAA College Division men's basketball season. It was won by Kentucky Wesleyan College, with Kentucky Wesleyan's Sam Smith named Most Outstanding Player.

== Increase in number of participating teams ==
In September 1965, the NCAA granted the State University of New York Athletic Conference (SUNYAC) an automatic berth in the NCAA College Division tournament. Tommy Niland, head coach of Le Moyne, which had received an at-large berth to each of the previous two NCAA tournaments, said that he was generally in favor of automatic qualification for the tournament, but, with one less at-large bid available, and the NCAA limiting how many teams from each area of the country enter the tournament, it would now be more difficult for teams in the northeast to be selected. Niland pointed out that none of the schools in the SUNYAC had ever been selected to play in the NCAA tournament in the past and that the conference might not be strong enough to merit an automatic bid. The SUNYAC joined the Middle Atlantic States Collegiate Athletic Conference (MASCAC) and the Tri-State Collegiate Basketball League as conferences with automatic tournament bids. This left five at-large bids available for the nearly 200 teams in the northeast, designated by the NCAA as District 1, since teams from this area generally participated in either the Northeast or East Regionals, each of which comprised four teams. Since the MASCAC was very large, with more than 20 teams, it split into two divisions: the Middle Atlantic Conference (MAC) North Division and the MAC South Division, and each division applied for and received an automatic bid to the NCAA tournament. This left only four at-large bids available for teams from the northeast. After considering the large number of teams in District 1, particularly high-quality teams without access to an automatic bid, the NCAA decided that instead of two regions of four teams each as had previously been the case, District 1 would have 12 bids with regional games played at three sites. The winner emerging from one of these sites would go directly to the national quarterfinals, while the other two winners would play each other for a quarterfinal berth. One site would feature the two MAC teams and two at-large teams. The second site would have the Tri-State League champion and three at-large teams. The SUNYAC champion and three at-large teams would play at the third site.

The expansion of the tournament would make it less likely that overflow District 1 teams would need to be sent to the Mideast Regional, as had been the case with Le Moyne and Ithaca in 1964, and Buffalo in 1965.

1966 NCAA Division II Men's sites - first round (white) first 2 rounds (yellow) regionals (cyan) Elite Eight (red)

== Regional participants ==
School	Outcome
American International	Fifth Place*
Assumption	Runner-up
Central Connecticut State	Regional Champion
Le Moyne	Fifth Place*
Northeastern	Third Place*
Philadelphia Textile	Third Place*
Potsdam State	Seventh Place*
Springfield	Seventh Place*

School	Outcome
Kentucky Wesleyan	Regional Champion
Oglethorpe	Runner-up
South Carolina State	Fourth Place
Winston-Salem	Third Place

School	Outcome
Albright	Third Place
Cheyney	Runner-up
Drexel	Fourth Place
Long Island	Regional Champion

School	Outcome
Akron	Regional Champion
Randolph–Macon	Fourth Place
Steubenville	Runner-up
Youngstown State	Third Place

School	Outcome
Fresno State	Regional Champion
Nevada	Third Place
San Diego	Fourth Place
Seattle Pacific	Runner-up

School	Outcome
Evansville	Runner-up
Indiana State	Fourth Place
Lamar	Third Place
Southern Illinois	Regional Champion

School	Outcome
Abilene Christian	Regional Champion
Arkansas State	Third Place
Jackson State	Fourth Place
SW Missouri State	Runner-up

School	Outcome
Colorado State College	Third Place*
North Dakota	Regional Champion
St. Procopius	Third Place*
Valparaiso	Runner-up

*indicates a tie

== Regionals ==
=== Northeast ===
First round Round of 36; See below
Assumption	105
American International	102
Division A Springfield, MA March 2 and 3
Northeastern	93
Springfield	80
Central Connecticut State	94
Potsdam State	82
Division B DeWitt, NY March 1 and 2
Philadelphia Textile	83
Le Moyne	61

Regional semifinals Round of 32; See below
Assumption	96
Northeastern	69
Central Connecticut State	97
Philadelphia Textile	75

Regional Final - Worcester, MA; Sweet 16; March 7
Assumption	87
Central Connecticut State	96

- Division B Consolation March 2 - Le Moyne 86, Potsdam State 63
- Division A Consolation March 3 - American International 96, Springfield 94*

Notes

- The right to host the regional final was given to the Division A winner, which was Assumption.
- American International College and Springfield College are both located in Springfield, Massachusetts. Springfield College was the host school for Division A.

=== South - Durham, North Carolina ===
Location: McClendon–McDougald Gym Host: North Carolina College at Durham

Regional semifinals Round of 32; March 4
Kentucky Wesleyan	81*
South Carolina State	73
Oglethorpe	69
Winston-Salem	66

Regional Final; Sweet 16; March 5
Kentucky Wesleyan	48
Oglethorpe	41

- Third Place - Winston-Salem 85, South Carolina State 81

=== East - Reading, Pennsylvania ===
Location: Bollman Center Host: Albright College

Regional semifinals Round of 32; March 4
Cheyney	61
Albright	56
Long Island	62
Drexel	54

Regional Final; Sweet 16; March 5
Cheyney	64
Long Island	67

- Third Place - Albright 78, Drexel 61

=== Mideast - Akron, Ohio ===
Location: Memorial Hall Host: Municipal University of Akron

Regional semifinals Round of 32; March 4
Steubenville	77
Randolph–Macon	56
Akron	70
Youngstown State	51

Regional Final; Sweet 16; March 5
Steubenville	76
Akron	93

- Third Place - Youngstown State 94, Randolph–Macon 63

=== Pacific Coast - Fresno, California ===
Location: North Gym Host: Fresno State College

Regional semifinals Round of 32; March 4
Seattle Pacific	69
San Diego	63
Fresno State	127
Nevada	78

Regional Final; Sweet 16; March 5
Seattle Pacific	58
Fresno State	64

- Third Place - Nevada 74, San Diego 71

=== Great Lakes - Carbondale, Illinois ===
Location: SIU Arena Host: Southern Illinois University

Regional semifinals Round of 32; March 4
Evansville	111
Lamar	103
Southern Illinois	83
Indiana State	65

Regional Final; Sweet 16; March 5
Evansville	77
Southern Illinois	90

- Third Place - Lamar 93, Indiana State 78

=== Southwest - Jonesboro, Arkansas ===
Location: Indian Fieldhouse Host: Arkansas State College

Regional semifinals Round of 32; March 4
Abilene Christian	94
Jackson State	79
SW Missouri State	72
Arkansas State	71

Regional Final; Sweet 16; March 5
Abilene Christian	63
SW Missouri State	58

- Third Place - Arkansas State 84, Jackson State 77

=== Midwest - Grand Forks, North Dakota ===
Location: Hyslop Sports Center Host: University of North Dakota

Regional semifinals Round of 32; See below
Valparaiso	107
St. Procopius	76
North Dakota	84
Colorado State College	71

Regional Final; Sweet 16; March 7
Valparaiso	82
North Dakota	112

Note: The first-round game between North Dakota and Colorado State College was delayed a day to March 6; the Valparaiso/Saint Procopius game was played in Moorhead, Minnesota on March 5; and the third-place game was cancelled entirely. These occurrences were due to inclement weather.

*denotes each overtime played

== National Finals - Evansville, Indiana ==
Location: Roberts Municipal Stadium Host: Evansville College

National Quarterfinals; Elite Eight; March 9
Central Connecticut State	76
Kentucky Wesleyan	84
Long Island	68
Akron	74
Fresno State	70
Southern Illinois	93
Abilene Christian	62
North Dakota	63

National semifinals Final Four; March 10
Kentucky Wesleyan	105
Akron	74
Southern Illinois	69
North Dakota	61

National Championship; March 11
Kentucky Wesleyan	54
Southern Illinois	51

- Third Place - Akron 76, North Dakota 71

*denotes each overtime played

== All-tournament team ==
- Phil Jackson (North Dakota)
- David Lee (Southern Illinois)
- George McNeil (Southern Illinois)
- Clarence Smith (Southern Illinois)
- Sam Smith (Kentucky Wesleyan)

== See also ==
- 1966 NCAA University Division basketball tournament
- 1966 NAIA Basketball Tournament

== Sources ==
- 2010 NCAA Men's Basketball Championship Tournament Records and Statistics: Division II men's basketball Championship
- 1966 NCAA College Division Men's Basketball Tournament jonfmorse.com
