= Kentucky Wesleyan Panthers =

- University: Kentucky Wesleyan College
- Conference: G-MAC (primary)
- NCAA: Division II
- Athletic director: Rob Mallory
- Location: Owensboro, Kentucky
- Varsity teams: 13 (7 men's, 6 women's)
- Football stadium: Robert "Bullet" Wilson Field at Steele Stadium
- Basketball arena: Owensboro Sports Center
- Baseball stadium: Panther Park
- Softball stadium: Foster Field
- Soccer stadium: Panther Field
- Mascot: Wesley N. Panther
- Colors: Wesleyan purple and medium gray
- Website: kwcpanthers.com

The Kentucky Wesleyan Panthers are the athletic teams that represent Kentucky Wesleyan College, located in Owensboro, Kentucky, in intercollegiate sports as a member of the Division II level of the National Collegiate Athletic Association (NCAA).

== History ==
The Panthers primarily compete in the Great Midwest Athletic Conference (G-MAC), as a founding member since the 2013–14 academic year. The Panthers previously competed as a charter member of the Great Lakes Valley Conference (GLVC) from 1978–79 to 2011–12 (but was fulfilling its commitments to the final year of competition for its other sports in the GLVC as a full member for the 2012–13 school year; before beginning competition as a full G-MAC member). They also competed in the Kentucky Intercollegiate Athletic Conference (KIAC; now currently known as the River States Conference (RSC) since the 2016–17 school year) of the National Association of Intercollegiate Athletics (NAIA) from 1916–17 to 1954–55.

== Varsity teams ==
KWC competes in 13 intercollegiate varsity sports, listed below:

Men's sports	Women's sports
Baseball	Basketball
Basketball	Golf
Football	Soccer
Golf	Softball
Soccer	Tennis
Tennis	Volleyball
Wrestling	

=== Basketball ===
The men's basketball team advanced to the Division II championship game six consecutive years (1998–2003), winning in 1999 and 2001. In addition to these most recent successes, they also won six other championships (1966, 1968, 1969, 1973, 1987, and 1990) and were runners-up in 1957. Overall, Kentucky Wesleyan has won eight NCAA Division II National Men's Basketball Championships, which is the most by any NCAA Division II School.

=== Football ===
Kentucky Wesleyan has an American football team, which competes in the Division II Great Midwest Athletic Conference.

== Conference titles ==
Kentucky Wesleyan's athletic teams have won eighteen (18) Great Lakes Valley Conference (GLVC) championships. The KWC softball team won as total of four GLVC Championships, three in the 1980s (1984, 1986, and 1989) and one in 1994. The KWC men's golf team won its only GLVC championship in 1983. The KWC men's basketball team has won 13 GLVC championships.
