= 1960 NCAA College Division basketball tournament =

Edition of USA college basketball tournament

- Teams: 32
- Finals site: Roberts Municipal Stadium, Evansville, Indiana
- Champions: Evansville Purple Aces (2nd title)
- Runner-up: Chapman Panthers (1st title game)
- Semifinalists: Kentucky Wesleyan Panthers (2nd Final Four); Cornell (IA) Rams (1st Final Four)
- Winning coach: Arad McCutchan (2nd title)
- MOP: Ed Smallwood (Evansville)
- Attendance: 27,836

The 1960 NCAA College Division basketball tournament involved 32 schools playing in a single-elimination tournament to determine the national champion of men's NCAA College Division college basketball as a culmination of the 1959-60 NCAA College Division men's basketball season. It was won by the University of Evansville and Evansville's Ed Smallwood was the Most Outstanding Player.

1960 NCAA Division II Men's sites - regionals (cyan) Elite Eight (red)

== Regional participants ==
School	Outcome
Assumption	Third Place
Le Moyne	Fourth Place
St. Anselm	Runner-up
St. Michael's	Regional Champion

School	Outcome
Austin Peay	Runner-up
Belmont Abbey	Third Place
Johnson C. Smith	Fourth Place
Kentucky Wesleyan	Regional Champion

School	Outcome
American	Regional Champion
Drexel	Fourth Place
Fairfield	Runner-up
Upsala	Third Place

School	Outcome
Arkansas State	Fourth Place
Buffalo	Third Place
Evansville	Regional Champion
Wabash	Runner-up

School	Outcome
Augustana (IL)	Fourth Place
Lincoln (MO)	Runner-up
Milwaukee	Third Place
Wheaton (IL)	Regional Champion

School	Outcome
Chapman	Regional Champion
Fresno State	Runner-up
San Francisco State	Fourth Place
Trinity (TX)	Third Place

School	Outcome
Cornell (IA)	Regional Champion
Prairie View	Runner-up
South Dakota State	Third Place
Wartburg	Fourth Place

School	Outcome
Abilene Christian	Runner-up
Colorado College	Fourth Place
Lamar	Third Place
Truman	Regional Campion

== Regionals ==
=== Northeast - Burlington, Vermont ===
Location: Burlington Memorial Auditorium Host: Saint Michael's College

Regional semifinals Round of 32; March 3
St. Michael's	73
Assumption	50
St. Anselm	108
Le Moyne	75

Regional Final; Sweet 16; March 4
St. Michael's	99
St. Anselm	95

- Third Place - Assumption 94, Le Moyne 68

=== South - Owensboro, Kentucky ===
Location: Owensboro Sportscenter Host: Kentucky Wesleyan College

Regional semifinals Round of 32; March 4
Kentucky Wesleyan	108
Johnson C. Smith	80
Austin Peay	74
Belmont Abbey	63

Regional Final; Sweet 16; March 5
Kentucky Wesleyan	83
Austin Peay	69

- Third Place - Belmont Abbey 70, Johnson C. Smith 59

=== East - Staten Island, New York ===
Location: Sutter Gym Host: Wagner College

Regional semifinals Round of 32; March 4
Fairfield	56
Drexel	44
American	83
Upsala	74

Regional Final; Sweet 16; March 5
Fairfield	74
American	75

- Third Place - Upsala 74, Drexel 69

=== Mideast - Evansville, Indiana ===
Location: Roberts Municipal Stadium Host: Evansville College

Regional semifinals Round of 32; March 3
Evansville	91
Arkansas State	74
Wabash	76
Buffalo	65

Regional Final; Sweet 16; March 4
Evansville	89
Wabash	68

- Third Place - Buffalo 53, Arkansas State 52

=== Great Lakes - Wheaton, Illinois ===
Location: Alumni Gymnasium Host: Wheaton College

Regional semifinals Round of 32; March 4
Wheaton (IL)	82
Augustana (IL)	67
Lincoln (MO)	100
Milwaukee	92

Regional Final; Sweet 16; March 5
Wheaton	78
Lincoln	59

- Third Place - Milwaukee 109, Augustana 82

=== Pacific Coast - Fresno, California ===
Location: North Gym Host: Fresno State College

Regional semifinals Round of 32; March 4
Fresno State	62
San Francisco State	49
Chapman	73
Trinity (TX)	52

Regional Final; Sweet 16; March 5
Fresno State	62
Chapman	70

- Third Place - Trinity 72, San Francisco State 64

=== Midwest - Galesburg, Illinois ===
Location: Memorial Gym Host: Knox College

Regional semifinals Round of 32; March 4
Cornell (IA)	72
Wartburg	67
Prairie View	78
South Dakota State	65

Regional Final; Sweet 16; March 5
Cornell	93
Prairie View	79

- Third Place - South Dakota State 93, Wartburg 77

=== Southwest - Kirksville, Missouri ===
Location: Pershing Arena Host: Northeast Missouri State Teachers College

Regional semifinals Round of 32; March 4
Truman	82
Lamar	81
Abilene Christian	109
Colorado College	65

Regional Final; Sweet 16; March 5
Truman	79
Abilene Christian	76

- Third Place - Lamar 88, Colorado College 67

*denotes each overtime played

== National Finals - Evansville, Indiana ==
Location: Roberts Municipal Stadium Host: Evansville College

National Quarterfinals; Elite Eight; March 9
St. Michael's	55
Kentucky Wesleyan	99
American	91
Evansville	101
Wheaton	67
Chapman	73
Cornell	83
Truman	81

National semifinals Final Four; March 10
Kentucky Wesleyan	69
Evansville	76
Chapman	79
Cornell	64

National Championship; March 11
Evansville	90
Chapman	69

- Third Place - Kentucky Wesleyan 86, Cornell 76

*denotes each overtime played

== All-tournament team ==
- Gary Auten (Kentucky Wesleyan)
- Tom Cooke (Chapman)
- William Jones (American)
- Ed Smallwood (Evansville)
- Dale Wise (Evansville)

== See also ==
- 1960 NCAA University Division basketball tournament
- 1960 NAIA Basketball Tournament

== Sources ==
- 2010 NCAA Men's Basketball Championship Tournament Records and Statistics: Division II men's basketball Championship
- 1960 NCAA College Division Men's Basketball Tournament jonfmorse.com
