= Samuel Cozen =

American basketball player and coach

Sam Cozen
Personal information
- Born: December 25, 1907 Kyiv, Russian Empire
- Died: September 21, 1983 (aged 75) United States

Career information
- High school: South Philadelphia (Philadelphia, Pennsylvania)
- College: Temple (1929–1930)

Career history

Coaching
- 1949–1953: Overbrook HS
- 1952–1968: Drexel

Career highlights
- As head coach: 12× MAC College–Southern champion (1954–1957, 1959–1961, 1963–1967); MAC Tournament champion (1967)

Samuel D. Cozen (December 25, 1907 – September 21, 1983) was an American basketball player and coach. At the time of retirement, Cozen was the winningest coach in Drexel men's basketball history. The basketball court at Drexel University's Daskalakis Athletic Center is named the Sam Cozen Court in his honor.

== Early life and playing career ==
Cozen attended South Philadelphia High School. He played college basketball at Temple University.

== Coaching career ==
As a coach at Overbrook High School in the 1950s, he coached the legendary Wilt Chamberlain for one season, in 1952–53. In 1952, Cozen became the head coach of the Drexel Dragons men's basketball team, spending the very first season dually coaching both Overbrook and Drexel. He coached the Dragons until 1968, accumulated 213 total wins and was an eleven-time Middle Atlantic Conferences champion during his 16-year Drexel coaching career. At the time of retirement he was the longest tenured and winningest coach in program history.

== Honors ==
- Drexel Athletics Hall of Fame
- Philadelphia Jewish Sports Hall of Fame
- The basketball court at Drexel University's Daskalakis Athletic Center is named the Sam Cozen Court in his honor.
- The Philadelphia-Area Small Coaches' Association (PASCCA) has previously awarded the Sam Cozen Player of the Week Award.
