= Towson Tigers men's basketball statistical leaders =

The Towson Tigers men's basketball statistical leaders are individual statistical leaders of the Towson Tigers men's basketball program in various categories, including points, three-pointers, assists, blocks, rebounds, and steals. Within those areas, the lists identify single-game, single-season, and career leaders. The Tigers represent Towson University in the NCAA's Colonial Athletic Association.

Towson began competing in intercollegiate basketball in 1959. The NCAA did not officially record assists as a stat until the 1983–84 season, and blocks and steals until the 1985–86 season, but Towson's record books includes players in these stats before these seasons. These lists are updated through the end of the 2020–21 season.

== Scoring ==
Career
Rk	Player	Points	Seasons
1	Devin Boyd	2,000	1988–89 1989–90 1990–91 1991–92 1992–93
2	Pat McKinley	1,832	1973–74 1974–75 1975–76 1976–77
3	Scooter Alexander	1,778	1991–92 1992–93 1993–94 1994–95 1995–96
4	Brian Matthews	1,665	1974–75 1975–76 1976–77 1977–78
5	Larry Witherspoon	1,546	1971–72 1972–73 1973–74
6	Kurk Lee	1,541	1988–89 1989–90
7	Nicolas Timberlake	1,522	2018–19 2019–20 2020–21 2021–22 2022–23
8	Mike Morsell	1,509	2014–15 2015–16 2016–17 2017–18
9	Ralph Blalock	1,498	1992–93 1993–94 1994–95 1995–96
10	Bill Leonard	1,469	1983–84 1984–85 1985–86 1986–87

Season
Rk	Player	Points	Season
1	Gary Neal	810	2006–07
2	Kurk Lee	805	1989–90
3	Kurk Lee	736	1988–89
4	Terrance Jacobs	692	1991–92
5	Larry Witherspoon	687	1972–73
6	Jerrelle Benimon	673	2013–14
7	Zane Martin	635	2017–18
8	Devin Boyd	622	1992–93
9	Nicolas Timberlake	584	2022–23
10	Tyler Tejada	567	2025–26

Single game
Rk	Player	Points	Season	Opponent
1	Larry Witherspoon	51	1972–73	American
2	Devin Boyd	46	1992–93	UMBC
3	Kurk Lee	44	1989–90	UMBC
4	Gary Neal	41	2006–07	Samford
	Kurk Lee	41	1989–90	Drexel
6	Gary Neal	40	2005–06	James Madison
7	Terrance Jacobs	39	1991–92	UMBC
	Kurk Lee	39	1988–89	Delaware
9	Devin Boyd	38	1990–91	Delaware
	Kurk Lee	38	1988–89	Bucknell
	Larry Witherspoon	38	1973–74	Salisbury State
	Dan Roberts	38	1968–69	Catholic

== Rebounds ==
Career
Rk	Player	Rebounds	Seasons
1	Pat McKinley	1,421	1973–74 1974–75 1975–76 1976–77
2	Brian Matthews	1,062	1974–75 1975–76 1976–77 1977–78
3	Charles Thompson	1004	2019–20 2020–21 2021–22 2022–23 2023–24
4	Bobby Washington	970	1974–75 1975–76 1976–77 1977–78
5	Robert Nwankwo	806	2007–08 2008–09 2009–10 2011–12
6	Lawrence Hamm	788	2002–03 2003–04 2004–05 2005–06
7	Jerrelle Benimon	750	2012–13 2013–14
8	John Davis	713	2013–14 2014–15 2015–16 2016–17
9	Larry Witherspoon	694	1971–72 1972–73 1973–74
10	Timajh Parker-Rivera	683	2012–13 2013–14 2014–15 2015–16

Season
Rk	Player	Rebounds	Season
1	Jerrelle Benimon	404	2013–14
2	Pat McKinley	381	1976–77
3	Pat McKinley	353	1974–75
4	Pat McKinley	347	1973–74
5	Jerrelle Benimon	346	2012–13
6	Brian Matthews	334	1977–78
7	Pat McKinley	326	1975–76
8	Robert Nwankwo	323	2011–12
9	Brian Matthews	301	1976–77
10	Larry Witherspoon	296	1972–73

Single game
Rk	Player	Rebounds	Season	Opponent
1	Pat McKinley	30	1974–75	Roanoke
2	Pat McKinley	25	1973–74	Randolph-Macon
3	Larry Witherspoon	24	1972–73	Baltimore
4	Pat McKinley	23	1974–75	Frostburg State
	Pat McKinley	23	1974–75	York
	Pat McKinley	23	1974–75	George Mason
7	Dennis Tunstall	21	2018–19	Delaware
	Jerrelle Benimon	21	2012–13	Oregon State
	Junior Hairston	21	2007–08	Niagara
	Junior Hairston	21	2007–08	Loyola
	Brian Matthews	21	1977–78	Albany
	Pat McKinley	21	1975–76	Catholic
	Pat McKinley	21	1973–74	Salisbury State
	Larry Witherspoon	21	1972–73	Loyola

== Assists ==
Career
Rk	Player	Assists	Seasons
1	Devin Boyd	438	1988–89 1989–90 1990–91 1991–92 1992–93
2	Brian Allen	389	1999–00 2000–01 2001–02 2002–03
3	Bill Leonard	366	1983–84 1984–85 1985–86 1986–87
4	Michael Keyes	360	1993–94 1994–95 1995–96 1996–97
5	Rica Page	351	1981–82 1982–83 1983–84 1984–85
6	Damon Cason	321	1995–96 1996–97 1997–98 1998–99 1999–00
7	Brian Morris	315	2008–09 2009–10 2010–11
8	Sam Sutton	312	2000–01 2001–02
9	Dylan Williamson	300	2023–24 2024–25 2025–26
10	Roger Dickens	299	1976–77 1977–78

Season
Rk	Player	Assists	Season
1	Roger Dickens	152	1977–78
2	Marty Johnson	151	1987–88
	Rica Page	151	1981–82
4	C.C. Williams	147	2007–08
	Brian Allen	147	2001–02
	Roger Dickens	147	1976–77
7	Cameron Holden	145	2022–23
8	Tony Franklin	142	2008–09
9	Tim Crossin	139	2005–06
	Devin Boyd	139	1988–89

Single game
Rk	Player	Assists	Season	Opponent
1	C.C. Williams	14	2006–07	Georgia State
2	C.C. Williams	13	2006–07	Delaware
	Brian Allen	13	2001–02	Drexel
	Rodney Norris	13	1976–77	St. Thomas Aquinas
5	Tommy Jones	12	1985–86	Bucknell
	Chuck Blue	12	1971–72	Salisbury State
	Ed Weibel	12	1967–68	Shepherd College
8	Cameron Holden	11	2022–23	Delaware
	Tim Crossin	11	2005–06	Drexel
	Michael Keyes	11	1994–95	Winthrop
	Devin Boyd	11	1989–90	Rider
	Devin Boyd	11	1988–89	William & Mary
	Marty Johnson	11	1987–88	Caldwell
	Rica Page	11	1981–82	Baltimore
	Leo McGainey	11	1980–81	Northeastern
	Leo McGainey	11	1980–81	Campbell
	Roger Dickens	11	1977–78	Baltimore
	Mike Jeffers	11	1975–76	York
	Jim Hubbard	11	1969–70	Millersville

== Steals ==
Career
Rk	Player	Steals	Seasons
1	Brian Matthews	269	1974–75 1975–76 1976–77 1977–78
2	Devin Boyd	264	1988–89 1989–90 1990–91 1991–92 1992–93
3	Bill Leonard	219	1983–84 1984–85 1985–86 1986–87
4	Marty Johnson	199	1986–87 1987–88
5	Brian Allen	195	1999–00 2000–01 2001–02 2002–03
6	Scooter Alexander	194	1991–92 1992–93 1993–94 1994–95 1995–96
7	Kurk Lee	182	1988–89 1989–90
8	Roger Dickens	155	1976–77 1977–78
9	Terrance Jacobs	132	1990–91 1991–92
10	Cameron Holden	116	2021–22 2022–23

Season
Rk	Player	Steals	Season
1	Marty Johnson	124	1987–88
2	Kurk Lee	98	1988–89
3	Brian Matthews	91	1977–78
4	Devin Boyd	84	1990–91
	Kurk Lee	84	1989–90
6	Roger Dickens	83	1976–77
7	Marty Johnson	70	1986–87
8	Devin Boyd	69	1992–93
	Terrance Jacobs	69	1991–92
10	Cameron Holden	67	2021–22
	Brian Allen	67	2001–02
	Brian Allen	67	2000–01

Single game
Rk	Player	Steals	Season	Opponent
1	Marty Johnson	11	1987–88	Bucknell
2	Roger Dickens	10	1976–77	Baltimore
3	Marty Johnson	9	1987–88	West Virginia Wesleyan
	Chuck Lightening	9	1991–92	George Mason
	Brian Matthews	9	1977–78	Morgan State
6	Cameron Holden	7	2021–22	Elon
	Brian Allen	7	2002–03	Hofstra
8	Cameron Holden	6	2022–23	Bryant
	Cameron Holden	6	2021–22	Delaware
	Josh Brown	6	2009–10	James Madison
	C.C. Williams	6	2007–08	Hofstra
	C.C. Williams	6	2006–07	Georgia State
	Tim Crossin	6	2005–06	William & Mary
	Brian Allen	6	2002–03	Hofstra
	Sam Sutton	6	2001–02	Old Dominion

== Blocks ==
Career
Rk	Player	Blocks	Seasons
1	John James	244	1990–91 1991–92 1992–93 1993–94
2	Pat McKinley	239	1973–74 1974–75 1975–76 1976–77
3	Robert Nwankwo	223	2007–08 2008–09 2009–10 2011–12
4	Charles Thompson	198	2019–20 2020–21 2021–22 2022–23 2023–24
5	Tony Dixon	143	2001–02 2002–03 2003–04 2004–05
6	Junior Hairston	129	2007–08 2008–09
7	Timajh Parker-Rivera	127	2012–13 2013–14 2014–15 2015–16
8	Bobby Washington	126	1974–75 1975–76 1976–77 1977–78
9	Dennis Tunstall	120	2016–17 2017–18 2018–19 2019–20
10	Jerrelle Benimon	104	2012–13 2013–14

Season
Rk	Player	Blocks	Season
1	Pat McKinley	86	1976–77
2	Robert Nwankwo	83	2009–10
3	John James	82	1993–94
4	Tony Dixon	81	2002–03
5	Robert Nwankwo	77	2011–12
6	Tommy Breaux	66	2006–07
7	John James	63	1992–93
8	Jerrelle Benimon	60	2012–13
	Junior Hairston	60	2008–09
10	Tony Dixon	57	2003–04

Single game
Rk	Player	Blocks	Season	Opponent
1	Pat McKinley	9	1976–77	St. Thomas Aquinas
2	Tony Dixon	8	2002–03	William & Mary
	Tony Dixon	8	2002–03	Norfolk State
4	Charles Thompson	7	2020–21	William & Mary
	Walter Foster	7	2015–16	Drexel
	Jerrelle Benimon	7	2012–13	William & Mary
	Robert Nwankwo	7	2009–10	Georgia State
	John James	7	1993–94	American
9	Bilal Dixon	6	2012–13	Cincinnati Christian
	Robert Nwankwo	6	2011–12	Georgia State
	Robert Nwankwo	6	2009–10	Hofstra
	Robert Nwankwo	6	2009–10	Bowling Green
	Calvin Lee	6	2009–10	Morgan State
	Calvin Lee	6	2008–09	Navy
	Tommy Breaux	6	2006–07	VCU
	Tommy Breaux	6	2006–07	Vermont
	Tony Dixon	6	2003–04	William & Mary
	Tony Dixon	6	2002–03	Hofstra
	John James	6	1993–94	Charleston Southern
	John James	6	1992–93	Liberty
	John James	6	1993–94	Lehigh
	Greg McClinton	6	1985–86	James Madison
	Joe Miller	6	1980–81	St. Mary's
