= List of Drexel Dragons in the NBA draft =

The Drexel Dragons men's basketball team, representing Drexel University, has had 7 players drafted into the National Basketball Association (NBA) since the league began holding drafts in 1947.

Each NBA franchise seeks to add new players through an annual draft. The NBA uses a draft lottery to determine the first three picks of the NBA draft; the 14 teams that did not make the playoffs the previous year are eligible to participate. After the first three picks are decided, the rest of the teams pick in reverse order of their win–loss record. To be eligible for the NBA draft, a player in the United States must be at least 19 years old during the calendar year of the draft and must be at least one year removed from the graduation of his high school class. From 1967 until the ABA–NBA merger in 1976, the American Basketball Association (ABA) held its own draft.

== Key ==
F	Forward	C	Center	G	Guard

^{*}	Selected to an all-star game (ABA All-Star Game, NBA All-Star game)
^{†}	Won a championship (ABA Champion, NBA Champion)
^{‡}	Inducted into Naismith Memorial Basketball Hall of Fame

== Players selected ==
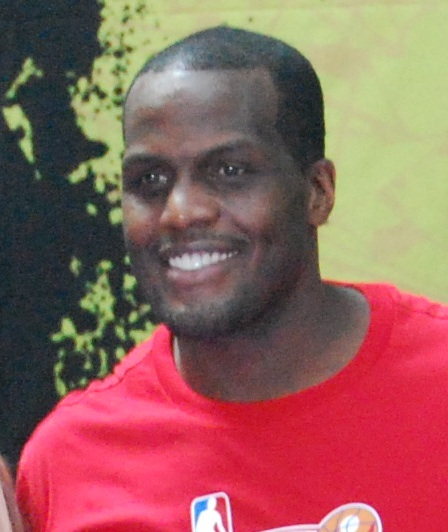
Malik Rose was drafted 44th overall by the Charlotte Hornets in the 1996 NBA Draft.

Year	Round	Pick	Overall	Player name	Position	NBA team	Notes
1974	8	15	141	Greg Newman	F	Detroit Pistons	—
1981	8	13	174	Len Hatzenbeller	C	Indiana Pacers	—
1982	10	19	224	Randy Burkert	F	Philadelphia 76ers	—
1984	7	21	160	Richard Congo	G	Philadelphia 76ers	—
1984	9	21	205	Michael Mitchell	C	Philadelphia 76ers	—
1988	3	23	73	Michael Anderson	G	Indiana Pacers	First Drexel player to appear in an NBA game
1996	2	15	44	Malik Rose^{†}	F	Charlotte Hornets	NBA Champion (1999, 2003)
2025	2	16	46	Amari Williams	C	Orlando Magic	—

== Notes ==
- Damion Lee was not drafted to the NBA, but was the third player to appear in an NBA game, and became the second Drexel alumni to win an NBA championship in 2022
