= 1989–90 Towson State Tigers men's basketball team =

American college basketball season

1989–90 Towson Tigers men's basketball

ECC Regular season co-champions ECC tournament champions

NCAA tournament
- Conference: East Coast Conference
- Record: 18–13 (8–6 ECC)
- Head coach: Terry Truax (7th season)
- Home arena: Towson Center

1989–90 East Coast Conference men's basketball standings
	Conf.				Overall
Team	W		L	PCT	W		L	PCT
Lehigh	8	–	6	.571	18	–	12	.600
Towson State †	8	–	6	.571	18	–	13	.581
Hofstra	8	–	6	.571	13	–	15	.464
Delaware	7	–	7	.500	16	–	13	.552
Lafayette	7	–	7	.500	15	–	13	.536
Drexel	7	–	7	.500	13	–	15	.464
Bucknell	6	–	8	.429	15	–	14	.517
Rider	5	–	9	.357	10	–	18	.357
† 1990 ECC tournament winner Rankings from AP poll

The 1989–90 Towson State Tigers men's basketball team represented Towson State University as a member of the East Coast Conference during the 1989–90 NCAA Division I men's basketball season. The team was led by head coach Terry Truax and played their home games at the Towson Center. They finished the season 18–13, 8–6 in ECC play to tie for the regular season conference title. The Tigers won the ECC tournament to earn an automatic bid to the NCAA tournament as No. 16 seed in the Midwest region. Towson State was defeated in the first round by top-ranked, No. 1 seed Oklahoma, 77–68.

== Roster ==
1989–90 Towson Tigers men's basketball team
Players
Coaches

Pos.	#	Name	Height	Weight	Year	Hometown
G	10	Devin Boyd	6 ft 1 in (1.85 m)	—	So
G		Chuck Lightening	6 ft 5 in (1.96 m)	—	So
PG	15	Kurk Lee	6 ft 3 in (1.91 m)	185 lb (84 kg)	Sr	Paul Laurence Dunbar	Baltimore, Maryland

Head coach

- Terry Truax

Assistant coach(es)

Legend

- (C) Team captain
- (S) Suspended
- (I) Ineligible
- (W) Walk-on
- Injured
- Current redshirt

== Schedule and results ==
Date time, TV	Rank^{#}	Opponent^{#}	Result	Record	Site (attendance) city, state
Regular season
Nov 28, 1989*		Howard	W 83–64	1–0	Towson Center; Baltimore, Maryland
Nov 30, 1989*		at Gettysburg	W 102–66	2–0	Gettysburg, Pennsylvania
Dec 3, 1989*		at No. 12 North Carolina	L 70–87	2–1	Dean Smith Center; Chapel Hill, North Carolina
Dec 6, 1989*		at Navy	W 73–70	3–1	Halsey Field House; Annapolis, Maryland
Dec 8, 1989*		vs. Maryland-Baltimore County	W 100–97	4–1	
Dec 9, 1989*		vs. Mount St. Mary's	W 81–68	5–1	
Dec 16, 1989*		at No. 1 Syracuse	L 75–105	5–2	Carrier Dome; Syracuse, New York
Dec 18, 1989*		at Saint Francis (PA)	L 75–95	5–3	DeGol Arena; Loretto, Pennsylvania
Dec 22, 1989*		at Loyola (MD)	W 87–79	6–3	Reitz Arena; Baltimore, Maryland
Dec 27, 1989*		at Washington	L 68–73	6–4	Bank of America Arena; Seattle, Washington
Dec 30, 1989*		at New Mexico	L 68–96	6–5	The Pit; Albuquerque, New Mexico
Jan 3, 1990*		at Pepperdine	L 79–91	6–6	Firestone Fieldhouse; Malibu, California
Jan 13, 1990		at Rider	L 82–83	6–7 (0–1)	Alumni Gymnasium; Lawrenceville, New Jersey
Jan 17, 1990		Drexel	W 98–79	7–7 (1–1)	Towson Center; Baltimore, Maryland
Jan 20, 1990		Lafayette	W 68–65	8–7 (2–1)	Towson Center; Baltimore, Maryland
Jan 24, 1990		at Delaware	L 77–89	8–8 (2–2)	Delaware Field House; Newark, Delaware
Jan 27, 1990		at Bucknell	L 74–76	8–9 (2–3)	Davis Gym; Lewisburg, Pennsylvania
Jan 31, 1990		Hofstra	W 66–64	9–9 (3–3)	Towson Center; Baltimore, Maryland
Feb 3, 1990		at Lehigh	L 69–87	9–10 (3–4)	Stabler Arena; Bethlehem, Pennsylvania
Feb 5, 1990*		Maryland-Baltimore County	W 90–74	10–10	Towson Center; Baltimore, Maryland
Feb 7, 1990		Rider	W 102–74	11–10 (4–4)	Towson Center; Baltimore, Maryland
Feb 10, 1990		at Drexel	W 104–95	12–10 (5–4)	Daskalakis Athletic Center; Philadelphia, Pennsylvania
Feb 14, 1990		at Lafayette	L 70–83	12–11 (5–5)	Kirby Sports Center; Easton, Pennsylvania
Feb 17, 1990		Delaware	W 87–84	13–11 (6–5)	Towson Center; Baltimore, Maryland
Feb 21, 1990		Bucknell	L 66–72	13–12 (6–6)	Towson Center; Baltimore, Maryland
Feb 24, 1990		at Hofstra	W 73–65	14–12 (7–6)	Physical Fitness Center; Hempstead, New York
Feb 26, 1990		Lehigh	W 92–82	15–12 (8–6)	Towson Center; Baltimore, Maryland
ECC Tournament
Mar 3, 1990*		Rider; ECC Tournament Quarterfinal	W 74–63	16–12	Towson Center; Baltimore, Maryland
Mar 4, 1990*		Delaware; ECC Tournament Semifinal	W 85–71	17–12	Towson Center; Baltimore, Maryland
Mar 5, 1990*		Lehigh; ECC tournament championship	W 73–60	18–12	Towson Center; Baltimore, Maryland
NCAA Tournament
Mar 15, 1990*	(16 MW)	vs. (1 MW) No. 1 Oklahoma; First Round	L 68–77	18–13	Frank Erwin Center; Austin, Texas
*Non-conference game. ^{#}Rankings from AP Poll. (#) Tournament seedings in parentheses. MW=Midwest. All times are in Eastern Time.

== Awards and honors ==
- Kurk Lee – ECC Player of the Year (2nd time)
