= 1990–91 Towson State Tigers men's basketball team =

American college basketball season

1990–91 Towson State Tigers men's basketball

ECC Regular season champions ECC tournament champions

NCAA tournament
- Conference: East Coast Conference
- Record: 19–11 (10–2 ECC)
- Head coach: Terry Truax (8th season)
- Home arena: Towson Center

1990–91 East Coast Conference men's basketball standings
	Conf.				Overall
Team	W		L	PCT	W		L	PCT
Towson State †	10	–	2	.833	19	–	11	.633
Delaware	8	–	4	.667	16	–	13	.552
Hofstra	7	–	5	.583	14	–	14	.500
Drexel	7	–	5	.583	12	–	16	.429
Rider	4	–	8	.333	14	–	16	.467
UMBC	4	–	8	.333	7	–	22	.241
Central Connecticut State	2	–	10	.167	4	–	24	.143
† 1991 ECC tournament winner Rankings from AP poll

The 1990–91 Towson State Tigers men's basketball team represented Towson State University as a member of the East Coast Conference during the 1990–91 NCAA Division I men's basketball season. The team was led by eighth-year head coach Terry Truax and played their home games at the Towson Center. They finished the season 19–11, 10–2 in ECC play to win the regular season conference title. The Tigers won the ECC tournament to earn an automatic bid to the NCAA tournament as No. 16 seed in the Midwest region. Towson State was defeated in the first round by No. 1 seed Ohio State, 91–74.

== Roster ==
1990–91 Towson State Tigers men's basketball team
Players
Coaches

Pos.	#	Name	Height	Weight	Year	Hometown
G	10	Devin Boyd	6 ft 1 in (1.85 m)	—	Jr
G		Chuck Lightening	6 ft 5 in (1.96 m)	—	Jr
C	42	John James	6 ft 8 in (2.03 m)	—	Fr

Head coach

- Terry Truax

Assistant coach(es)

Legend

- (C) Team captain
- (S) Suspended
- (I) Ineligible
- (W) Walk-on
- Injured
- Current redshirt

== Schedule and results ==
Date time, TV	Rank^{#}	Opponent^{#}	Result	Record	Site (attendance) city, state
Regular season
Nov 24, 1990*		at Dayton	L 79–99	0–1	UD Arena; Dayton, OH
Nov 26, 1990*		at Maryland	L 69–93	0–2	Cole Fieldhouse; College Park, MD
Nov 30, 1990		UMBC	W 83–75	1–2 (1–0)	Towson Center; Towson, MD
Dec 1, 1990*		Loyola (MD)	W 62–60	2–2	Towson Center; Towson, MD
Dec 5, 1990*		Navy	L 88–102	2–3	Towson Center; Towson, MD
Dec 18, 1990*		at Howard	W 77–62	3–3	Burr Gymnasium; Washington, D.C.
Dec 20, 1990*		vs. No. 3 Syracuse	L 73–78	3–4	Hersheypark Arena; Hershey, PA
Dec 28, 1990*		vs. Alabama; Low Country Basketball Classic	L 52–71	3–5	Charleston, SC
Dec 29, 1990*		vs. Navy	W 90–75	4–5	
Jan 4, 1991*		Bucknell	W 85–84	5–5	Towson Center; Towson, MD
Jan 7, 1991*		at Lehigh	L 83–85	5–6	Stabler Arena; Bethlehem, PA
Jan 12, 1991		at Central Connecticut	W 82–72	6–6 (2–0)	William H. Detrick Gymnasium; New Britain, CT
Jan 16, 1991		Rider	W 75–71	7–6 (3–0)	Towson Center; Towson, MD
Jan 23, 1991		at Drexel	W 72–70	9–6	Daskalakis Athletic Center; Philadelphia, PA
Jan 26, 1991		at UMBC	W 83–68	10–6	Retriever Activities Center; Catonsville, MD
Jan 28, 1991*		at Bucknell	W 89–83	11–6	Davis Gym; Lewisburg, PA
Feb 2, 1991		at Rider	W 85–62	13–6	Alumni Gymnasium; Lawrenceville, NJ
Feb 4, 1991*		Loyola (MD)	L 84–85	13–7	Towson Center; Towson, MD
Feb 9, 1991		Central Connecticut	W 84–76	15–7	Towson Center; Towson, MD
Feb 13, 1991		Drexel	L 75–78	15–8	Towson Center; Towson, MD
Feb 23, 1991*		Youngstown State	W 80–75	17–9	Towson Center; Towson, MD
Feb 25, 1991*		at No. 20 Virginia	L 49–72	17–10	University Hall; Charlottesville, VA
ECC Tournament
Mar 3, 1991*		UMBC; ECC Tournament Semifinal	W 78–76	18–10	Towson Center; Towson, MD
Mar 4, 1991*		Rider; ECC tournament championship	W 69–63	19–10	Towson Center; Towson, MD
NCAA Tournament
Mar 15, 1991*	(16 MW)	vs. (1 MW) No. 5 Ohio State; First Round	L 86–97	19–11	UD Arena; Dayton, OH
*Non-conference game. ^{#}Rankings from AP poll. (#) Tournament seedings in parentheses. MW=Midwest. All times are in Eastern Time.

== Awards and honors ==
- Devin Boyd – ECC Player of the Year; First-team All-ECC
