= 1989–90 Drexel Dragons men's basketball team =

American college basketball season

1989–90 Drexel Dragons men's basketball
- Conference: East Coast Conference
- Record: 13–15 (7–7 ECC)
- Head coach: Eddie Burke (13th season)
- Assistant coach: Walton Fuller (2nd season)
- Home arena: Daskalakis Athletic Center

1989–90 East Coast Conference men's basketball standings
	Conf.				Overall
Team	W		L	PCT	W		L	PCT
Lehigh	8	–	6	.571	18	–	12	.600
Towson State †	8	–	6	.571	18	–	13	.581
Hofstra	8	–	6	.571	13	–	15	.464
Delaware	7	–	7	.500	16	–	13	.552
Lafayette	7	–	7	.500	15	–	13	.536
Drexel	7	–	7	.500	13	–	15	.464
Bucknell	6	–	8	.429	15	–	14	.517
Rider	5	–	9	.357	10	–	18	.357
† 1990 ECC tournament winner Rankings from AP poll

The 1989–90 Drexel Dragons men's basketball team represented Drexel University during the 1989–90 NCAA Division I men's basketball season. The Dragons, led by 13th year head coach Eddie Burke, played their home games at the Daskalakis Athletic Center and were members of the East Coast Conference (ECC).

The team finished the season 13–15, and finished in 4th place in the ECC in the regular season.

On February 5, 1990, Todd Lehmann set the Drexel team record for most assists in a single game, recording 19 assists against Liberty.

== Roster ==
1989–90 Drexel Dragons men's basketball team
Players	Coaches
Pos. / # / Name / Height / Weight / Year / Previous school / Hometown; / / / — / —	Head coach: Eddie Burke (La Salle); Assistant coach(es): Walton Fuller (Drexel); Legend: (C) Team captain; (S) Suspended; (I) Ineligible; (W) Walk-on; Injured; Current redshirt

== Schedule ==
Date time, TV	Rank^{#}	Opponent^{#}	Result	Record	High points	High rebounds	High assists	Site (attendance) city, state
Regular season
November 27, 1889*		Maine	W 89–75	1–0	27 – Lehmann	11 – Raab	8 – Lehmann	Daskalakis Athletic Center (1,300); Philadelphia, PA
November 28, 1989*		at Saint Joseph's	L 87–94	1–1	20 – Thompson	7 – Arizin	9 – Lehmann	Palestra (7,271); Philadelphia, PA
December 1, 1989*		vs. Marist; Hartford Hawks Tournament semifinal	L 72–74 ^{OT}	1–2	29 – Lehmann	11 – Arizin	10 – Lehmann	Hartford Civic Center (2,172); Hartford, CT
December 2, 1989*		vs. Brown; Hartford Hawks Tournament 3rd place game	L 68–73	1–3	20 – Arizin	8 – Raabe	13 – Lehmann	Hartford Civic Center (1,522); Hartford, CT
December 12, 1989*		at UMBC	W 88–86	2–3	23 – Lehmann	9 – Raab	10 – Lehmann	Retriever Activities Center (833); Catonsville, MD
December 16, 1989*		at Villanova	L 57–74	2–4	13 – Arizin	10 – Raab	13 – Lehmann	John Eleuthère du Pont Pavilion (6,500); Villanova, PA
December 18, 1989*		at No. 16 Iowa	L 50–59	2–5	13 – Thompson	8 – Arizin	5 – Tied	Carver–Hawkeye Arena (15,500); Iowa City, IA
December 20, 1989*		at Stetson	L 77–87	2–6	20 – Arizin	5 – Raabe	9 – Lehmann	Edmunds Center (1,410); DeLand, FL
December 22, 1989*		at UCF	W 83–72	3–6	32 – Thompson	9 – Tied	14 – Lehmann	Education Gymnasium (258); Orlando, FL
January 2, 1990*		Long Island	W 86–76	4–6	22 – Lehmann	12 – Raab	8 – Lehmann	Daskalakis Athletic Center (1,602); Philadelphia, PA
January 4, 1990*		Boston University	L 62–80	4–7	14 – Arizin	8 – Raab	6 – Lehmann	Daskalakis Athletic Center (2,214); Philadelphia, PA
January 9, 1990*		at Manhattan	W 78–77	5–7	21 – Clark	7 – Arizin	10 – Lehmann	Draddy Gymnasium (612); New York, NY
January 13, 1990		Delaware	W 73–65	6–7 (1–0)	14 – Tied	12 – Raab	8 – Lehmann	Daskalakis Athletic Center (1,900); Philadelphia, PA
January 17, 1990		at Towson State	L 79–98	6–8 (1–1)	22 – Lehmann	6 – Raab	8 – Lehmann	Towson Center (1,074); Towson, MD
January 20, 1990		at Bucknell	W 87–86	7–8 (2–1)	28 – Arizin	7 – Arizin	7 – Lehmann	Davis Gym (2,115); Lewisburg, PA
January 24, 1990		at Hofstra	L 65–66	7–9 (2–2)	14 – Lehmann	10 – Clark	5 – Lehmann	Physical Fitness Center (604); Hempstead, NY
January 27, 1990		Lafayette	L 74–84	7–10 (2–3)	17 – Lehmann	6 – Raab	10 – Lehmann	Daskalakis Athletic Center (1,746); Philadelphia, PA
January 31, 1990		Lehigh	W 85–73	8–10 (3–3)	21 – Lehmann	10 – Clark	10 – Lehmann	Daskalakis Athletic Center (1,374); Philadelphia, PA
February 3, 1990		at Rider	L 70–72	8–11 (3–4)	19 – Arizin	7 – Clark	6 – Tied	Alumni Gymnasium (1,721); Lawrenceville, NJ
February 5, 1990*		Liberty	W 95–72	9–11	23 – Thompson	10 – Clark	19 – Lehmann	Daskalakis Athletic Center (774); Philadelphia, PA
February 7, 1990		at Delaware	L 63–69	9–12 (3–5)	19 – Raab	8 – Clark	8 – Lehmann	Delaware Field House (2,074); Newark, DE
February 10, 1990		Towson State	L 95–104	9–13 (3–6)	30 – Lehmann	7 – Tied	15 – Lehmann	Daskalakis Athletic Center (1,082); Philadelphia, PA
February 14, 1990		Bucknell	W 65–63	10–13 (4–6)	17 – Tied	7 – Raab	9 – Lehmann	Daskalakis Athletic Center (549); Philadelphia, PA
February 17, 1990		Hofstra	W 74–66	12–13 (5–6)	20 – Lehmann	7 – Raab	12 – Lehmann	Daskalakis Athletic Center (511); Philadelphia, PA
February 21, 1990		at Lafayette	W 70–61	13–13 (6–6)	16 – Tied	7 – Raab	9 – Lehmann	Kirby Sports Center (1,652); Easton, PA
February 24, 1990		at Lehigh	L 82–87 ^{OT}	12–14 (6–7)	19 – Lehmann	12 – Clark	9 – Lehmann	Stabler Arena (3,234); Bethlehem, PA
February 26, 1990		Rider	W 97–76	13–14 (7–7)	25 – Lehmann	10 – Clark	6 – Lehmann	Daskalakis Athletic Center (2,000); Philadelphia, PA
ECC Tournament
March 3, 1990	(6)	vs. (3) Lehigh; Quarterfinal	L 75–76	13–15	17 – Clark	10 – Raab	4 – Lehmann	Towson Center (1,000); Towson, MD
*Non-conference game. ^{#}Rankings from AP. (#) Tournament seedings in parentheses. All times are in Eastern Time.

== Awards ==
Todd Lehmann

- ECC All-Conference Second Team
