= 1990–91 Drexel Dragons men's basketball team =

American college basketball season

1990–91 Drexel Dragons men's basketball
- Conference: East Coast Conference
- Record: 12–16 (7–5 ECC)
- Head coach: Eddie Burke (14th season)
- Assistant coach: Walton Fuller (3rd season)
- Home arena: Daskalakis Athletic Center

1990–91 East Coast Conference men's basketball standings
	Conf.				Overall
Team	W		L	PCT	W		L	PCT
Towson State †	10	–	2	.833	19	–	11	.633
Delaware	8	–	4	.667	16	–	13	.552
Hofstra	7	–	5	.583	14	–	14	.500
Drexel	7	–	5	.583	12	–	16	.429
Rider	4	–	8	.333	14	–	16	.467
UMBC	4	–	8	.333	7	–	22	.241
Central Connecticut State	2	–	10	.167	4	–	24	.143
† 1991 ECC tournament winner Rankings from AP poll

The 1990–91 Drexel Dragons men's basketball team represented Drexel University during the 1990–91 NCAA Division I men's basketball season. The Dragons, led by 14th year head coach Eddie Burke, played their home games at the Daskalakis Athletic Center and were members of the East Coast Conference (ECC).

The team finished the season 12–16, and finished in 3rd place in the ECC in the regular season.

== Roster ==
1990–91 Drexel Dragons men's basketball team
Players	Coaches
Pos. / # / Name / Height / Weight / Year / Previous school / Hometown; / / / — / —	Head coach: Eddie Burke (La Salle); Assistant coach(es): Walton Fuller (Drexel); Legend: (C) Team captain; (S) Suspended; (I) Ineligible; (W) Walk-on; Injured; Current redshirt

== Schedule ==
Date time, TV	Rank^{#}	Opponent^{#}	Result	Record	High points	High rebounds	High assists	Site (attendance) city, state
Regular season
November 24, 1990*		at Penn State	L 83–86	0–1	–	–	–	Rec Hall; University Park, PA
November 26, 1990*		at No. 24 Villanova	L 71–92	0–2	–	–	–	The Pavilion; Philadelphia, PA
November 28, 1990*		Saint Joseph's	L 96–108	0–3	–	–	–	Daskalakis Athletic Center (2,500); Philadelphia, PA
November 30, 1990*		at Boston College	L 62–83	0–4	–	–	–	
December 1, 1990*		vs. Wagner	W 88–79	1–4	–	–	–	
December 10, 1990*		at Lafayette	L 68–71	1–5	–	–	–	
December 12, 1990*		at Maine	L 62–87	1–6	–	–	–	
December 18, 1990*		Manhattan	W 92–83	2–6	–	–	–	Daskalakis Athletic Center; Philadelphia, PA
December 21, 1990*		vs. Lamar; Texaco Star Classic	L 85–99	2–7	–	–	–	
December 22, 1990*		vs. Arkansas State	L 72–86	2–8	–	–	–	(8,126)
January 3, 1991		at Delaware	L 87–95	2–9 (0–1)	–	–	–	Delaware Field House; Newark, DE
January 5, 1991*		Lafayette	W 85–65	3–9	–	–	–	Daskalakis Athletic Center; Philadelphia, PA
January 9, 1991*		at Bucknell	L 73–87	3–10	–	–	–	Davis Gym; Lewisburg, PA
January 12, 1991		at Hofstra	L 71–78	3–11 (0–2)	–	–	–	
January 16, 1991*		Northeastern	L 90–98	3–12	–	–	–	Daskalakis Athletic Center; Philadelphia, PA
January 19, 1991		Central Connecticut	W 85–69	4–12 (1–2)	–	–	–	Daskalakis Athletic Center; Philadelphia, PA
January 23, 1991		Towson State	L 70–72	4–13 (1–3)	–	–	–	Daskalakis Athletic Center; Philadelphia, PA
January 26, 1991		at Rider	W 71–70	5–13 (2–3)	–	–	–	
January 28, 1991*		Lehigh	W 81–76	6–13	–	–	–	Daskalakis Athletic Center; Philadelphia, PA
January 30, 1991		UMBC	W 75–63	7–13 (3–3)	–	–	–	Daskalakis Athletic Center; Philadelphia, PA
February 7, 1991		Delaware	L 71–72	7–14 (3–4)	–	–	–	Daskalakis Athletic Center; Philadelphia, PA
February 9, 1991		Hofstra	W 68–61	8–14 (4–4)	–	–	–	Daskalakis Athletic Center; Philadelphia, PA
February 11, 1991*		at Long Island	W 93–77	9–14	–	–	–	
February 13, 1991		at Towson State	W 78–75	10–14 (5–4)	–	–	–	Towson Center; Towson, MD
February 16, 1991		at Central Connecticut	W 88–63	11–14 (6–4)	–	–	–	
February 20, 1991		at UMBC	L 73–77	11–15 (6–5)	–	–	–	
February 23, 1991		Rider	W 75–72	12–15 (7–5)	–	–	–	Daskalakis Athletic Center; Philadelphia, PA
ECC Tournament
March 2, 1991	(3)	vs. (6) Rider	L 68–71	12–16	–	–	–	Towson Center; Towson, MD
*Non-conference game. ^{#}Rankings from AP. (#) Tournament seedings in parentheses. All times are in Eastern Time.

== Awards ==
Jonathan Rabb

- ECC All-Conference First Team

Michael Thompson

- ECC All-Conference First Team

Mike Wisler

- ECC All-Rookie Team
