= 1991 East Coast Conference (Division I) men's basketball tournament =

- Classification: Division I
- Season: 1990–91
- Teams: 7
- Site: Towson Center; Towson, MD
- Champions: Towson State (2nd title)
- Winning coach: Terry Truax (2nd title)
- MVP: Darrick Suber (Rider)

1990–91 East Coast Conference men's basketball standings
	Conf.				Overall
Team	W		L	PCT	W		L	PCT
Towson State †	10	–	2	.833	19	–	11	.633
Delaware	8	–	4	.667	16	–	13	.552
Hofstra	7	–	5	.583	14	–	14	.500
Drexel	7	–	5	.583	12	–	16	.429
Rider	4	–	8	.333	14	–	16	.467
UMBC	4	–	8	.333	7	–	22	.241
Central Connecticut State	2	–	10	.167	4	–	24	.143
† 1991 ECC tournament winner Rankings from AP poll

The 1991 East Coast Conference men's basketball tournament was held March 2–4, 1991. The champion gained and an automatic berth to the NCAA tournament.

== Bracket and results ==
Quarterfinals; Saturday, March 2
4	Hofstra	58
5	UMBC	67
3	Drexel	68
6	Rider	71
2	Delaware	99
7	Central Connecticut State	85

Semifinals; Sunday, March 3
1	Towson State	78
5	UMBC	76
6	Rider	77
2	Delaware	75

Final; Monday, March 4
1	Towson State	69
6	Rider	63

* denotes overtime game

== All-Tournament Team ==
- Devin Boyd, Towson State
- Alexander Coles, Delaware
- Terrance Jacobs, Towson State
- Chuck Lightening, Towson State
- Darrick Suber, Rider – Tournament MVP
