= Ron Simpson (basketball) =

American basketball player

Personal information
- Listed height: 6 ft 6 in (1.98 m)

Career information
- High school: Immaculate Conception (Montclair, New Jersey)
- College: Adelphi (1983–1984); Rider (1985–1988)
- NBA draft: 1988: undrafted
- Playing career: 1988–199?
- Position: Small forward

Career highlights
- ECC co-Player of the Year (1987); First-team All-ECC (1987); Second-team All-ECC (1988)

Ronald Simpson is an American former professional basketball player and currently serves as a youth league coach. He had a standout college career at Rider University in which he was the 1987 East Coast Conference co-Player of the Year. As of 2021–22, Simpson serves as the founder and CEO of the South Jersey Titans AAU basketball program.

== Playing career ==
=== High school and college ===
A native of Montclair, New Jersey, Simpson attended Immaculate Conception High School where he became the school's boys' basketball all-time leading scorer. He would later be inducted into Immaculate's hall of fame. Simpson graduated in 1983 and went to play for Adelphi University, an NCAA Division II school in nearby Garden City, New York. In his freshman season, the only one in which he would play for Adelphi before transferring, he averaged 18 points and 8 rebounds per game and was named to the Division II All-Metro First Team.

Simpson then transferred to Division I school Rider in Lawrence Township, New Jersey. He redshirted (sat out) the 1984–85 season. As a sophomore in 1985–86 he averaged 16.6 points and 1.2 steals per game, making an immediate impact for the Broncs. The following season, Simpson's best of his collegiate career, he averaged 23.2 points and 5.1 rebounds per game. The 1986–87 was also the first season in which the NCAA implemented three-pointers, and Simpson took advantage by setting still-standing Rider records for made threes in a game (9) and season (98). He became the first Rider player to score 1,000 career points within his first two seasons. The East Coast Conference named him to their all-conference first-team, and alongside Lehigh's Daren Queenan he was named the ECC co-Player of the Year. In Simpson's senior season at Rider in 1987–88, he averaged 22.8 points and 6.0 rebounds per game. Despite putting up good numbers he did not attain the same recognition as his junior year, failing to repeat as the player of the year and was relegated to the All-ECC Second Team.

Among Rider's 1,000-point scorers, Simpsons' 20.0 career points per game average is the highest of all-time. He scored 1,735 points in just three seasons, which as of 2021–22 is still in the program's top 10. The 660 points he scored in his senior season once stood as a single-season school record. In 2010, Rider inducted Simpson into their athletics hall of fame.

=== Professional ===
Simpson went undrafted in the 1988 NBA draft. He instead went overseas to play professional and France but did not enjoy the expatriate lifestyle. He returned stateside and tried out for the former United States Basketball League (USBL) but did not make a team. It was then he decided to quite pursuing playing professional basketball and look toward a different career.

== Later life ==
From 1993 to 2013, Simpson served in the New Jersey Division of Criminal Justice. He was a sergeant in the street gang unit where he led many investigations, presentations and trainings. He stayed actively involved in the community and also served as a basketball coach in various youth leagues, middle schools, high schools, and even at the junior college level (Mercer County Community College). Since 2015 he has overseen the growth of an Amateur Athletic Union basketball program, the South Jersey Titans. Simpson also concurrently serves as the athletic coordinator for the Robbinsville Township Recreation Department.
