= Wilbur Thomas (basketball) =

American basketball player

Personal information
- Born: Washington, D.C., U.S.
- Listed height: 6 ft 6 in (1.98 m)
- Listed weight: 175 lb (79 kg)

Career information
- High school: Roosevelt (Washington, D.C.)
- College: American (1972–1975)
- NBA draft: 1975: 7th round, 115th overall pick
- Drafted by: Milwaukee Bucks
- Position: Power forward / small forward

Career highlights
- ECC co-Player of the Year (1975); First-team All-ECC (1975); 2× First-team All-MAC University–Eastern (1973, 1974)
- Stats at Basketball Reference

Wilbur Thomas is an American former basketball player known for his college career at American University. A native of Washington, D.C., Thomas played for three seasons for the American Eagles (1972–75). In his senior year, Thomas averaged 19.5 points and 11.2 rebounds per game while helping lead them to an East Coast Conference East Division championship. He was named to the All-ECC First Team and was ECC co-Player of the Year with Lafayette's Henry Horne. He graduated having scored 1,543 points and grabbed 803 rebounds, which were the third and seventh all-time marks in school history at the time.

Thomas was selected in the 1975 NBA draft by the Milwaukee Bucks in the seventh round (115th overall). He was waived prior to the start of the season and never played professionally.
