= 1990 East Coast Conference (Division I) men's basketball tournament =

- Classification: Division I
- Season: 1989–90
- Teams: 8
- Site: Towson Center; Towson, MD
- Champions: Towson State (1st title)
- Winning coach: Terry Truax (1st title)
- MVP: Kurk Lee (Towson State)

1989–90 East Coast Conference men's basketball standings
	Conf.				Overall
Team	W		L	PCT	W		L	PCT
Lehigh	8	–	6	.571	18	–	12	.600
Towson State †	8	–	6	.571	18	–	13	.581
Hofstra	8	–	6	.571	13	–	15	.464
Delaware	7	–	7	.500	16	–	13	.552
Lafayette	7	–	7	.500	15	–	13	.536
Drexel	7	–	7	.500	13	–	15	.464
Bucknell	6	–	8	.429	15	–	14	.517
Rider	5	–	9	.357	10	–	18	.357
† 1990 ECC tournament winner Rankings from AP poll

The 1990 East Coast Conference men's basketball tournament was held March 3–5, 1990. The champion gained and an automatic berth to the NCAA tournament.

== Bracket and results ==
Quarterfinals; Saturday, March 3
1	Towson State	74
8	Rider	63
4	Delaware	57
5	Lafayette	54
3	Lehigh	76
6	Drexel	75
2	Hofstra	67
7	Bucknell	72

Semifinals; Sunday, March 4
1	Towson State	85
4	Delaware	71
3	Lehigh	73
7	Bucknell	67

Final; Monday, March 5
1	Towson State	73
3	Lehigh	60

== All-Tournament Team ==
- Devin Boyd, Towson State
- Bob Krizansky, Lafayette
- Scott Layer, Lafayette
- Kurk Lee, Towson State – Tournament MVP
- Dozie Mbonu, Lafayette
