= Henry Horne (basketball) =

American basketball player

Personal information
- Listed height: 6 ft 6 in (1.98 m)

Career information
- High school: Piscataway (Piscataway, New Jersey)
- College: Lafayette (1972–1975)
- NBA draft: 1975: undrafted
- Position: Power forward / center

Career highlights
- ECC co-Player of the Year (1975); First-team All-ECC (1975)

Henry Horne is an American former basketball player known for his college career at Lafayette College. A native of Piscataway, New Jersey, Horne played for three seasons for the Lafayette Leopards (1972–75). In his senior year, Horne averaged 11.3 points, 11.4 rebounds, and 1.9 assists per game while helping lead them to an East Coast Conference West Division championship. He was named to the All-ECC First Team and was ECC co-Player of the Year with American's Wilbur Thomas.

Horne never played professionally, instead opting for a lifelong career in education administration.
