= 1894–95 Drexel Blue and Gold men's basketball team =

American college basketball season

1894–95 Drexel Blue and Gold men's basketball
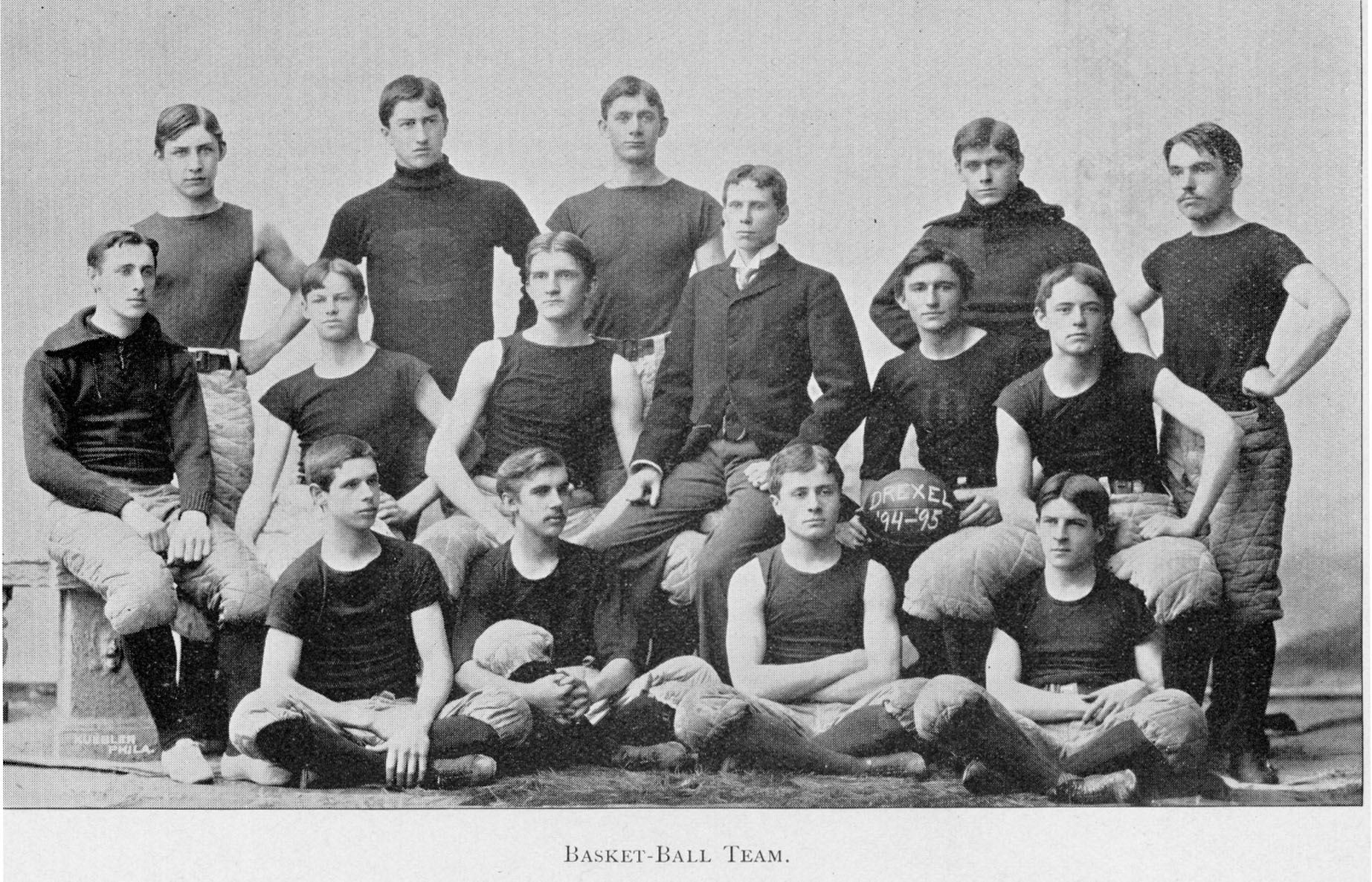
- Conference: Independent
- Record: 7–2–1
- Head coach: John W. Gray (1st season)
- Captain: Robert Woodward
- Home arena: Main Building

1894–95 collegiate men's basketball independents standings
	Conf.				Overall
Team	W		L	PCT	W		L	PCT
Drexel		–		–	7	–	2	.778
Temple		–		–	8	–	3	.727
Rankings from AP Poll

The 1894–95 Drexel Blue and Gold men's basketball team represented Drexel Institute of Art, Science and Industry during the 1894–95 men's basketball season. The Blue and Gold, led by 1st year head coach John Gray, played their home games at Main Building. The 1894–95 team was the first at Drexel, and the 5th collegiate team to start up in the US. The first game of the season against Temple University was the first intercollegiate event ever played at the school.

== Roster ==
1894–95 Drexel Dragons men's basketball team
Players
Coaches

Pos.	#	Name	Height	Weight	Year	Previous school	Hometown
		Robert J. Woodward (C)	—	—
		Green	—	—
		Shoe	—	—
		Price	—	—
		Dunning	—	—
		Bosbyshell	—	—
		Gaskill	—	—
		Randolph	—	—
		Kempton	—	—
		Merrick	—	—
		Shick	—	—
		Cummings	—	—
		Waring	—	—
		W.H. Gruel	—	—
		Grogan	—	—
		Gormon	—	—
		Young	—	—

Head coach

- John Gray

Assistant coach(es)

Legend

- (C) Team captain
- (S) Suspended
- (I) Ineligible
- (W) Walk-on
- Injured
- Current redshirt

== Schedule ==
Date time, TV	Rank^{#}	Opponent^{#}	Result	Record	High points	High rebounds	High assists	Site (attendance) city, state
Regular season
November 22, 1894 *		at Temple	W 26–1	1–0	–	–	–	
December 1, 1894 *		Temple	W 13–0	?–0	–	–	–	Philadelphia, PA
December 14, 1894*		Pennsylvania Railroad YMCA	W 5–3	?–0	–	–	–	
January 25, 1895 *		Central High School (PA)	W 1–0	?–0	1 – Shoe	–	–	Philadelphia, PA
February 9, 1895 *		at Central YMCA	W Forfeit		–	–	–	Central Gymnasium; Philadelphia, PA
February 16, 1895*		at Wilmington YMCA	L 2–4	?–1	1 – 2 tied	–	–	Wilmington, DE
March 2, 1895*		at Pennsylvania Railroad YMCA	W 2–0	?–1	–	–	–	
March 15, 1895 *		Wilmington YMCA	L 1–2	?–2	–	–	–	Philadelphia, PA
March 22, 1895 *		Pennsylvania Railroad YMCA	T 0–0	7–2–1	–	–	–	Philadelphia, PA
Unknown*		West Philadelphia YMCA Reserves	W	–	–	–	–	
*Non-conference game. ^{#}Rankings from AP. (#) Tournament seedings in parentheses. All times are in Eastern Time.
