= Jake Fendley =

American basketball player (1929–2002)

Personal information
- Born: June 12, 1929 Danville, Illinois
- Died: August 9, 2002 (aged 73) Oak Park, Illinois
- Listed height: 6 ft 0 in (1.83 m)
- Listed weight: 180 lb (82 kg)

Career information
- High school: South Shore (Chicago, Illinois)
- College: Northwestern (1948–1951)
- NBA draft: 1951: 3rd round, 23rd overall pick
- Drafted by: Fort Wayne Pistons
- Playing career: 1951–1953
- Position: Guard
- Number: 6

Career history
- 1951–1953: Fort Wayne Pistons
- Stats at NBA.com
- Stats at Basketball Reference

John Phillip "Jake" Fendley (June 12, 1929 – August 9, 2002) was an American basketball player for the Fort Wayne Pistons of the NBA. He was drafted with the fourth pick in the third round of the 1951 NBA draft. He played two seasons for the Pistons, appearing in 103 career games. In his career, Jake averaged 2.8 points per game, 1.2 rebounds per game and 0.9 assists per game.

== Career statistics ==
Legend
GP	Games played	GS	Games started	MPG	Minutes per game
FG%	Field goal percentage	3P%	3-point field goal percentage	FT%	Free throw percentage
RPG	Rebounds per game	APG	Assists per game	SPG	Steals per game
BPG	Blocks per game	PPG	Points per game	**Bold**	Career high

=== NBA ===
==== Regular season ====
Year	Team	GP	MPG	FG%	FT%	RPG	APG	PPG
1951–52	Fort Wayne	**58**	**11.2**	.318	**.789**	**1.4**	**1.0**	**3.2**
1952–53	Fort Wayne	45	8.4	**.400**	.667	1.0	.8	2.3
Career		103	10.0	.344	.742	1.2	.9	2.8

==== Playoffs ====
Year	Team	GP	MPG	FG%	FT%	RPG	APG	PPG
1952	Fort Wayne	1	**4.0**	.250	–	1.0	**1.0**	**2.0**
1953	Fort Wayne	1	2.0	–	–	1.0	.0	.0
Career		2	3.0	.250	–	1.0	.5	1.0
