= Todd Tripucka =

American basketball player

Personal information
- Born: September 16, 1954 (age 72)
- Listed height: 6 ft 2 in (1.88 m)

Career information
- High school: Bloomfield (Bloomfield, New Jersey)
- College: Lafayette (1973–1976)
- NBA draft: 1976: undrafted
- Position: Shooting guard

Career highlights
- ECC Player of the Year (1976); 2× First-team All-ECC (1975, 1976)

Michael Todd Tripucka (born September 16, 1954) is an American former basketball player best known for his college career at Lafayette College during the 1970s. A native of Bloomfield, New Jersey, Tripucka played three varsity seasons at Lafayette and led the Leopards to a 58–22 overall record and one appearance in the National Invitation Tournament (NIT).

He was twice selected as a first-team all-East Coast Conference (ECC) player, and at the end of his senior year of 1975–76 he was named the ECC Player of the Year. That season, Tripucka averaged a school-record 26.1 points per game, which was seventh best in all of NCAA Division I men's basketball. In one game against Saint Joseph's he scored 42 points, still the fourth-best single game effort in school history. Other still-standing single season school records include points in one season (679) and field goals attempted (520). Tripucka finished his career with 1,445 points, which through the 2015–16 season is the ninth-most at Lafayette. He went undrafted in the 1976 NBA draft, but was later inducted into Lafayette's Hall of Fame in 1989.

== Family ==
Todd is the son of Frank Tripucka, an American collegiate and professional football quarterback, at Notre Dame, in the National Football League, in the Canadian Football League, and in the early American Football League. He is the brother of former Notre Dame and National Basketball Association (NBA) star Kelly Tripucka. He is also the uncle of football players Shane Tripucka and Travis Tripucka as well as professional lacrosse player Jake Tripucka.
