= Reggie Smith (Northeastern Illinois basketball) =

American basketball player

Personal information
- Born: c. 1970/71 Chicago, Illinois, U.S.
- Listed height: 6 ft 4 in (1.93 m)

Career information
- High school: South Shore (Chicago, Illinois)
- College: San Jacinto (1990–1992); Northeastern Illinois (1992–1994)
- NBA draft: 1994: undrafted
- Position: Shooting guard / small forward
- Number: 32

Career highlights
- ECC Player of the Year (1994); First-team All-ECC (1994); First-team All-TJCAC (1991)

Reggie Smith (born c. 1970/71) is an American former basketball player known for his college career at Northeastern Illinois University. A native of Chicago's South Shore neighborhood, Smith starred at South Shore High School before finding success at the collegiate level. He first competed for San Jacinto College (SJC), a junior college in Pasadena, Texas, from 1990 to 1992 before his two-year stint at Northeastern Illinois (1992–94).

During Smith's freshman season at San Jacinto he was named to the All-Texas Junior College Athletic Conference First Team as well as the All-TJCAC Tournament Team. Smith was also a teammate of future NBA star Sam Cassell.

Smith signed to play basketball at the University of New Orleans after his time at SJC. He was ineligible, however, for not completing his associate degree. He instead enrolled at Northeastern Illinois, a more affordable in-state option, and became eligible to compete beginning in 1992–93. The Golden Eagles were an independent (not affiliated with an athletic conference) during Smith's junior season in which he averaged 17.9 points and 5.0 rebounds a game. In 1993–94, Smith's senior season, Northeastern Illinois joined NCAA Division I's East Coast Conference (ECC). Behind Smith's 25.1 points, 5.4 rebounds, and 2.0 steals per game, the Golden Eagles finished in second place. Smith was selected to the All-ECC First Team and was named the ECC Player of the Year.

No team selected Smith in the following 1994 NBA draft.
