= Jaye Andrews =

American basketball player (born 1962)

Personal information
- Born: October 5, 1962 (age 64) Huntington, West Virginia, U.S.
- Listed height: 6 ft 5 in (1.96 m)
- Listed weight: 185 lb (84 kg)

Career information
- High school: Landon School (Bethesda, Maryland)
- College: Bucknell (1981–1985)
- NBA draft: 1985: 7th round, 159th overall pick
- Drafted by: Philadelphia 76ers
- Playing career: 1985–1987
- Position: Shooting guard / small forward
- Coaching career: 1993–2014

Career history

Playing
- 1985: Wildwood Aces
- 1986–1987: Bracknell Pirates

Coaching
- 1993–2001: Landon School
- 2004–2014: Greenhill School

Career highlights
- ECC Player of the Year (1985); AP honorable mention All-American (1985); 2× First-team All-ECC (1984, 1985)
- Stats at Basketball Reference

Jaye Andrews (born October 5, 1962) is an American former basketball player known for his college career at Bucknell University during the 1980s. He was a two-time all-conference performer and the 1985 East Coast Conference Player of the Year as a senior.

== College career ==
Andrews is a native of Bethesda, Maryland, where he attended the Landon School. He had a strong senior season campaign in 1980–81 and was offered the opportunity to play for the Bucknell Bison in college. He played the small forward position.

In 1981–82, Andrews' freshman season at Bucknell, he averaged 8.2 points and 2.7 rebounds per game. As a sophomore, he averaged 13.7 and 3.1 per game, respectively. Then, as a junior, Andrews led the Bison to win the East Coast Conference regular season title, and came within an ECC tournament championship game away from earning a berth into the NCAA tournament. Andrews was honored as First Team All-ECC member.

In 1984–85, Andrews' senior season, he averaged 16.8 points, 7.0 rebounds, 2.3 assists and 1.5 steals per game. The Bison repeated as ECC regular season champions and lost a second ECC tournament championship game. Andrews earned his second consecutive First Team All-ECC honor. He was also named the ECC Player of the Year, which was the first and only time a Bucknell player ever won that award. At the time of his graduation, his 1,535 points stood fourth all-time in school history. In 1991, Bucknell inducted Andrews into their athletics hall of fame.

== Professional career and later life ==
The Philadelphia 76ers selected Andrews in the ensuing 1985 NBA draft's seventh round (159th overall). He was released after their rookie camp and never made a roster spot. Andrews believes the 76ers discovered him earlier in the summer while playing for the USBL's Wildwood Aces, where he led the team in scoring at 17.4 points per game.

Andrews was living in Chicago after that. About a year later he received a phone call from the general manager of the Bracknell Pirates of the British Basketball League (BBL). He thought it was a prank call at first but soon realized it was legitimate. He joined the Pirates for the 1986–87 season before walking away from professional basketball to enter a non-basketball career, a decision he later claimed he regrets.

In his non-professional basketball life, Andrews has worked in various roles within secondary education school systems. From 1993 to 2001, while at his alma mater the Landon School, he served as the Director of Alumni Affairs, a middle school math teacher, and coached the varsity basketball team. He moved to Texas and since 2001 has been the Greenhill School's middle school math teacher, their boys' high school varsity basketball head coach (2004–2014), and in various faculty roles in the Equity & Inclusion department (since 2019). Andrews was named the Texas Large Private Schools Coach of the Year following the 2013–14 season.

Andrews married Andrea Sears, a 1987 Bucknell graduate, and they have three daughters – Melanie, Camille, and Ellen Margaret. Camille played soccer for Bucknell while Ellen Margaret played basketball for Yale.
