= Richard Congo =

American basketball player

Personal information
- Born: May 17, 1961 (age 65) Philadelphia, Pennsylvania, U.S.
- Listed height: 6 ft 7 in (2.01 m)
- Listed weight: 215 lb (98 kg)

Career information
- High school: Overbrook (Philadelphia, Pennsylvania)
- College: Lafayette (1979–1980); Drexel (1981–1984)
- NBA draft: 1984: 7th round, 160th overall pick
- Drafted by: Philadelphia 76ers
- Position: Power forward

Career highlights
- ECC Player of the Year (1984); First-team All-ECC (1984); Second-team All-ECC (1983)
- Stats at Basketball Reference

Richard S. Congo (born May 17, 1961) is an American former basketball player for Lafayette College and Drexel University. He was a two-time all-conference performer and the 1984 East Coast Conference Player of the Year as a senior.

== Early life ==
Congo is a native of Philadelphia, Pennsylvania, where he attended Overbrook High School. As a senior he averaged 10 points and 10 rebounds per game.

== College career ==
Congo chose to play for the Lafayette Leopards after his prep career. In 1979–80, his true freshman season, he averaged 8.3 points and 4.4 rebounds per game. He took a break for personal reasons midway through the season, though he came back and helped the Leopards gain a berth into the 1980 NIT where they lost in the first round to Virginia. He chose to leave the program after one season, contributed in part due to cultural adjustment difficulties.

Due to NCAA transfer rules, Congo had to redshirt (sit out) his sophomore season, which was his first playing for the Drexel Dragons. Over the next three seasons with Drexel, Congo started all 88 games he appeared in. Congo was named to the All-East Coast Conference Second Team as a junior in 1982–83, then as a senior was named to the All-ECC First Team, a year in which he set the school single-season record for field goal percentage (.563) while averaging 16.6 points and 8.1 rebounds per game. He was also named the 1984 East Coast Conference Player of the Year.

Congo finished his two-school collegiate career with 1,453 points and 735 rebounds. In 1989, Drexel University inducted him into their athletics hall of fame.

== Professional career ==
The Philadelphia 76ers selected Congo in the 1984 NBA draft's seventh round (160th overall). He was cut after rookie camp before appearing in a regular season game, however, and then spent time playing professionally in Birmingham, England.
