= South Shore High School (Chicago) =

South Shore International College Prep

Location
- 1955 East 75th Street; Chicago, Illinois 60649; United States
- 41.7561°N 87.5794°W

Information
- School type: Public; Secondary; Magnet
- Motto: "Anchored in Excellence"
- Opened: 1940
- Status: Open
- School district: Chicago Public Schools
- CEEB code: 140699
- Principal: Michelle C. Flatt
- Grades: 9–12
- Gender: Coed
- Enrollment: 551 (2025–2026)
- Campus type: Urban
- Colors: Royal Blue; Kelly Green
- Athletics conference: Chicago Public League
- Team name: Tars
- Accreditation: North Central Association of Colleges and Schools
- Newspaper: Shore Line
- Yearbook: The Tide
- Website: southshoreinternational.org

South Shore International College Prep High School is a public 4–year selective enrollment magnet high school located in the South Shore neighborhood on the Southeast Side of Chicago, Illinois, United States. Opened in 1940 as South Shore High School, the school is a part of the Chicago Public Schools district.

== History ==
The school opened in 1940 as South Shore High School at 7626 South Constance Avenue. During its first 20 years, the student body was predominantly White and consisted primarily of students living in the South Shore community. By the late 1950s, the community began to experience an increase in the population of African American residents. South Shore High School, which was built to accommodate a total of 2,000 students, by 1964 had become overcrowded. The Chicago Board of Education decided either an addition or a new school was needed to relieve the overcrowding. Plans to construct an addition to the school were announced in 1965. Construction of the addition at 75th street and Constance Avenue began in April 1966. The extension was to cost $2.5 million and was to be completed by 1967, but plans were revised several times, reaching a budget of $4.1 million. Contractor for the extension was Mercury Builders of Oak Park, Illinois. Ground-breaking took place in 1966 and the project was completed in August 1969. The new addition opened for students on September 6, 1969.

=== Small schools (2001–2011) ===
Beginning in 2001, the expanded school campus, located at 7527–7627 South Constance Avenue was divided into four small specialized high schools: the School of Entrepreneurship, the School of the Arts, the School of Leadership, and the School of Technology. The small school concept continued until 2009, when the Chicago Board of Education decided to phase out the four schools; this was completed at the end of the 2010–11 school year.

==== School of Leadership ====
After the small schools were phased out, the extension building was demolished in early 2012. The remaining students were moved into the South Shore High School of Leadership, which was housed in the original campus at 7627 South Constance Avenue beginning with the 2011–2012 school year. At the same time, the district had opened a new high school at 1955 East 75th Street. The latter was a selective enrollment magnet school designed to attract students from all areas of the city. The School of Leadership on Constance Avenue was closed at the end of the 2013–2014 school year, having been replaced by the new magnet high school on 75th Street.

=== South Shore International College Prep ===
South Shore International College Prep High School, at 1955 East 75th Street, opened for the 2011–2012 school year two blocks northeast of the original South Shore High School campus and adjacent to Rosenblum Park. South Shore International College Prep is a selective enrollment magnet school that accepts students from throughout the city of Chicago. The school uses the same team name (Tars) and colors (kelly green and royal blue) as the former South Shore High School

== Other information ==
The school's newspaper The Shore Line won a first-place ranking in the American Scholastic Press Association annual review in 1983. The newspaper was the first to win a first-place ranking in the city of Chicago. South Shore students won first place two consecutive times in an annual essay contest sponsored by the citizen school's committee in 1981 and 1982. The school was featured in a CBS documentary about the Chicago's public school system in 1984.

== Demographics ==
As of the 2025–2026 school year, 95.28% of South Shore's student body was African American, 3.63% Latino, 0.3% Multi-Racial and 0.3% White. Low-income students made up 76.8% of South Shore's student body.

== Athletics ==
South Shore competes in the Chicago Public League (CPL) and is a member of the Illinois High School Association (IHSA). The boys' basketball team were Public League champions in 1943–1944 and 1946–1947. The girls' track and field team placed first in the state in Class AA in 1980–1981. In 2014, coach Dan Novosel led the football program to a 9-0 record and an Inter-City 2 Championship. The championship was the first for the newly opened College Prep. The boys' track and field team placed first in 2A Sectionals in the 2021–2022 school year, while in the same year the boys' football team was the Great Lakes League champion.

== Notable alumni ==
- Doe Boyland – Professional baseball player
- Cynthia Plaster Caster (1965) – Artist
- Frank Donald Drake (1948) – Astronomer and astrophysicist. Co-founder of the SETI Institute.
- Stanley Elkin – Novelist and short story writer
- Larry Ellison (1962) – CEO and co-founder of Oracle Corporation
- Jake Fendley (1947) – Professional basketball player
- Carla Hayden (1969) – 14th Librarian of Congress
- Trent Hubbard (1982) – Professional baseball outfielder
- Marv Levy (1943) – NFL coach and member of the Pro Football Hall of Fame
- Marc May (1974) – NFL tight end (1987)
- Suze Orman (1969) – Author, financial advisor, television producer, and television host
- Karalyn Patterson (1961) – Psychologist
- Reggie Smith (1990) – College basketball player
- Walter Stanley (1981) – Former NFL wide receiver (1985–92)
- Jerald Walker (1981) - Writer and professor; Guggenheim fellow, National Book Award finalist
- James D. Watson (1946) – Biochemist and co-discoverer of the structure of DNA, 1962 Nobel Prize in Medicine or Physiology
