= Terrance Jacobs =

American basketball player (born 1969)

Personal information
- Born: March 18, 1969 (age 57)
- Listed height: 6 ft 3 in (1.91 m)
- Listed weight: 185 lb (84 kg)

Career information
- High school: Southern (Baltimore, Maryland)
- College: Old Dominion (1988–1989); Allegany CC (1989–1990); Towson (1990–1992)
- NBA draft: 1992: undrafted
- Playing career: 1992–1999
- Position: Point guard / shooting guard

Career highlights
- ECC Player of the Year (1992); First-team All-ECC (1992)

Terrance Jacobs (born March 18, 1969) is an American former professional basketball player whose career took him to leagues in Hong Kong, Austria, Germany, Honduras, as well as domestic leagues in the United States. He played point guard and shooting guard. While in college, Jacobs was the 1992 East Coast Conference Player of the Year as a senior at Towson.

== Playing career ==
=== High school and college ===
Jacobs grew up in Baltimore, Maryland. He attended Southern High School, where in 1987–88 he was named to the All-Metro Area First Team. He chose to play college basketball at Old Dominion University, where as a freshman in 1988–89 he appeared in 27 games for the Monarchs, starting four of them, and averaged 3.3 points per game. Jacobs decided that Old Dominion was not the right fit, so he transferred to Allegany Community College for his sophomore year, opting instead to play junior college basketball while deciding on his next university.

Jacobs chose to finish his college career at Towson University in his home state of Maryland, partly due to the team's success in 1989–90 as having been conference champions who earned a berth into the 1990 NCAA tournament. In his first season with the Tigers, his junior year, he averaged 15.9 points, 5.3 rebounds, 2.3 assists, and 2.1 steals per game. The Tigers won the East Coast Conference regular season title, the ECC tournament championship, and received the automatic berth into the 1991 NCAA tournament, where they lost to Ohio State in the opening round.

As a senior in 1991–92, Jacobs increased his production up to 23.1 points, 7.9 rebounds, 2.8 assists, and 2.3 steals per game. Towson finished second in the regular season and won the ECC Tournament championship. Due to the East Coast Conference not having enough full-time members according to NCAA standards, the conference did not receive any bids to the 1992 NCAA tournament. Jacobs was honored as an All-ECC First Team selection as well as being named the ECC Player of the Year. It was the fourth straight season in which a Towson player won the award.

=== Professional ===
Jacobs did not get selected in the 1992 NBA draft. He spent 1992 through 1999 playing internationally, first in Hong Kong but then followed by stints in Austria, Germany, and Honduras. He returned to the United States and played for teams in the Continental Basketball Association, United States Basketball League, and American Basketball Association. He also tried out for the International Basketball League's Baltimore Bayrunners. His professional career concluded in 1999.
