= Len Hatzenbeller =

American basketball player (born 1959)

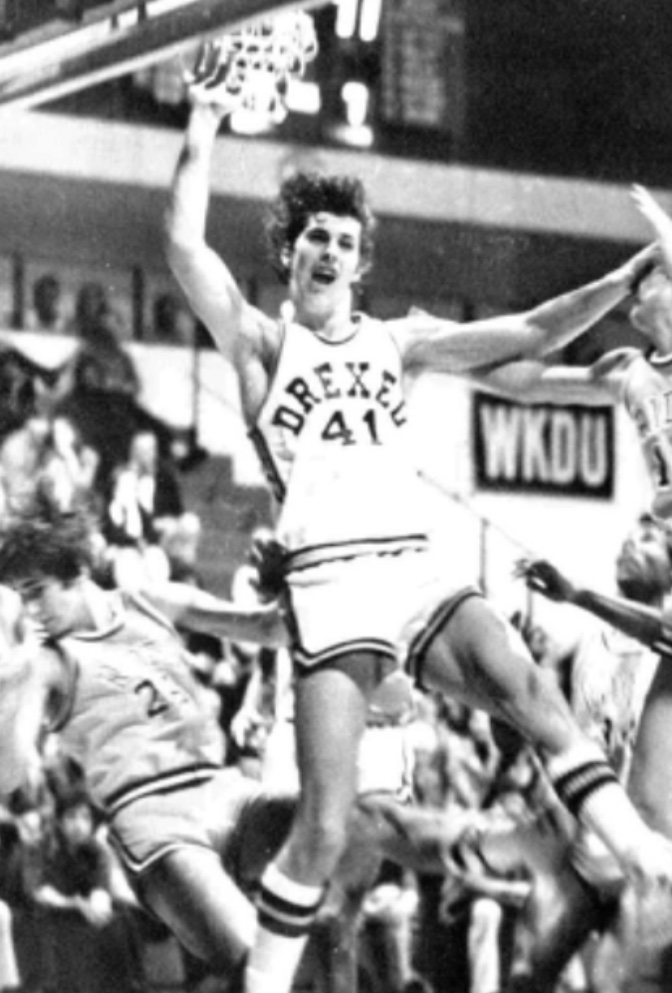
- Hatzenbeller as a freshman at Drexel in 1977–78

Personal information
- Born: May 6, 1959 (age 67) Philadelphia, Pennsylvania, U.S.
- Listed height: 6 ft 10 in (2.08 m)
- Listed weight: 215 lb (98 kg)

Career information
- High school: Cardinal Dougherty (Philadelphia, Pennsylvania); William Tennent (Warminster, Pennsylvania)
- College: Drexel (1977–1981)
- NBA draft: 1981: 8th round, 174th overall pick
- Drafted by: Indiana Pacers
- Position: Center
- Number: 41

Career highlights
- AP Honorable mention All-American (1981); ECC Player of the Year (1981); First-team All-ECC (1981)
- Stats at Basketball Reference

Leonard Phillip Hatzenbeller Jr. (born May 6, 1959) is an American former basketball center. In college, he competed for Drexel. He was both an honorable mention All-American and the East Coast Conference Player of the Year in 1981.

A native of Philadelphia, Pennsylvania, Hatzenbeller attended Cardinal Dougherty High School in Philadelphia before transferring to William Tennent High School in Warminster. As a senior he averaged approximately 21 points and 15 rebounds per game. Hatzenbeller received a scholarship to play for nearby Drexel University, where from 1977 to 1981 he set eight then-school records, including the single season marks for scoring average (21.4), points (589) and field goals (214). He was honored as a first-team all-East Coast Conference (ECC) player as a senior along with the All-American and conference player of the year honors.

After graduation, Hatzenbeller was selected in the 1981 NBA draft by the Indiana Pacers (8th round, 174th overall) but never played in the league. In 1981–82 he competed for a professional team in Uppsala, Sweden before returning to the United States. In December 1982 he was one of the final cuts of the Continental Basketball Association's Rochester Zeniths.

In 1988, Hatzenbeller was inducted into Drexel's athletics hall of fame.
