= Daren Queenan =

American basketball player (born 1966)

Personal information
- Born: October 19, 1966 (age 60) Norristown, Pennsylvania, U.S.
- Listed height: 6 ft 4 in (1.93 m)
- Listed weight: 170 lb (77 kg)

Career information
- High school: Norristown (Norristown, Pennsylvania)
- College: Lehigh (1984–1988)
- NBA draft: 1988: undrafted
- Playing career: 1989–2002
- Position: Shooting guard / small forward

Career history
- 1988: Philadelphia Aces
- 1988–1989: Charleston Gunners
- 1989: Rapid City Thrillers
- 1990: Albany Patroons
- 1990–1991: La Crosse Catbirds
- 1991: Memphis Rockers
- 1991–1992: Gimnasia y Esgrima (CR)
- 1992–1999: Okapi Aalstar
- 1999–2000: Apollon Patras
- 2000–2001: Brandt Hagen
- 2001: Cáceres CB
- 2002: Joventut Badalona

Career highlights
- 2× PBL scoring champion (1998, 1999); Greek 2nd Division Top Scorer (2000); CBA Rookie of the Year (1989); CBA All-Rookie Team (1989); ECC co-Player of the Year (1987); 4× First-team All-ECC (1985–1988); ECC Rookie of the Year (1985); No. 12 retired by Lehigh Mountain Hawks

Daren Queenan (born October 19, 1966) is an American former basketball player. Born in Norristown, Pennsylvania, he attended Norristown High School as a teenager but went virtually unrecruited by colleges to play basketball except for nearby Lehigh University in Bethlehem, Pennsylvania. Queenan was an undersized center in high school, standing at 6 ft 4 in (1.93 m), but then-assistant Lehigh coach Fran McCaffery signed him to play for the Mountain Hawks and turned him into a shooting guard/small forward (toward the end of Queenan's career at Lehigh, McCaffery said, "You wouldn't believe how many coaches told me Daren couldn't play for them. Every coach makes mistakes, but when you say a kid can't play, and he scores 3,000 points, that's a mistake.") McCaffery would become Lehigh's head coach for Queenan's final three seasons.

== Basketball career ==
=== College ===
During Queenan's four-year college career, spanning from 1984–85 to 1987–88, he became one of the most prolific scorers in NCAA history. He led Lehigh in scoring all four seasons, finished second in the nation in points per game as a senior (28.4), and is still only one of eight players in Division I to have recorded 2,700+ points and 1,000+ rebounds. He holds numerous school records, including points in a game (49) and career (2,703) as well as total rebounds (1,013). Queenan led the Engineers to the school's first-ever appearance in the NCAA Men's Division I Basketball Championship as a freshman in 1985, then guided them to a second berth in 1988. He was a four-time First Team All-East Coast Conference selection and was the co-honoree of the 1987 ECC Player of the Year award. Especially known for highlight reel dunks, Queenan was also versatile and could play point guard as well.

=== Professional ===
Despite his record-setting collegiate career, Queenan was not drafted into the NBA, though he did play for the Detroit Pistons in their training camp. He was later cut because teams were not willing to risk signing a mid-sized player coming from a small, unestablished school (basketball-wise) such as Lehigh. He spent the first couple years after graduating playing in the Continental Basketball Association and even won the CBA Dunk Contest in 1989 as a member of the Charleston Gunners. He was selected as the CBA Rookie of the Year and named to the All-Rookie Team in 1989. After two failed NBA tryouts with the Houston Rockets and Detroit Pistons, Queenan realized that overseas was his most viable professional basketball option. Over the course of the next 12 years, he played for teams in the Philippines, Argentina, Belgium, France, Germany and Spain, plus a stint in the United States Basketball League in his later years. He spent the majority of his career in Belgium, where he has become a naturalized citizen and now holds dual citizenship with the United States.

== Later life ==
Queenan is married and has multiple children. He now works as a certified financial planner for TIAA-CREF.

== See also ==
- List of NCAA Division I men's basketball players with 2000 points and 1000 rebounds
- List of NCAA Division I men's basketball career scoring leaders
