= Terry Truax =

American basketball player and coach

Biographical details
- Born: June 10, 1945; Hancock, Maryland, U.S.
- Died: February 15, 2015 (aged 69); Fairfax, Virginia, U.S.

Playing career
- 1966–1968: Maryland

Coaching career (HC unless noted)
- 1968–1970: DeMatha Catholic HS (MD) (assistant)
- 1970–1971: North Carolina (assistant)
- 1971–1973: Virginia (assistant)
- 1973–1976: Florida (assistant)
- 1976–1981: Colorado (assistant)
- 1981–1983: Mississippi State (assistant)
- 1983–1997: Towson

Head coaching record
- Overall: 202–203 (.499) (college)
- Tournaments: 0–2 (NCAA Division I)

Accomplishments and honors

Championships
- 3 ECC tournament (1990–1992); 2 ECC regular season (1990, 1991); 2 Big South regular season (1993, 1994)

Awards
- 2x Big South Coach of the Year (1993, 1994)

Terry Truax (June 10, 1945 – February 15, 2015) was an American basketball coach, best known for his tenure as head coach for Towson University from 1983 to 1997.

Truax played college basketball at Maryland before embarking on his coaching career. Truax was an assistant to Morgan Wootten at DeMatha Catholic High School in 1969–70. He held coaching staff roles at North Carolina, Virginia, Florida, Colorado and Mississippi State before being named head coach at Towson in 1983. Truax led the Tigers to a 202–203 record, highlighted by their first two NCAA tournament appearances in 1990 and 1991. He also coached at the high school and junior college levels and had stints in China and South Korea.

== Head coaching record ==
=== College ===
Record table
Season	Team	Overall	Conference	Standing	Postseason
Towson State Tigers (East Coast Conference) (1983–1992)
1983–84	Towson State	10–19	5–11	T–7th	
1984–85	Towson State	7–21	5–9	T–7th	
1985–86	Towson State	8–20	5–9	T–6th	
1986–87	Towson State	14–16	5–9	6th	
1987–88	Towson State	14–16	4–10	7th	
1988–89	Towson State	19–10	10–4	2nd	
1989–90	Towson State	18–13	8–6	T–1st	NCAA Division I First Round
1990–91	Towson State	19–11	10–2	1st	NCAA Division I First Round
1991–92	Towson State	17–13	9–3	T–2nd	
Towson State Tigers (Big South Conference) (1992–1995)
1992–93	Towson State	18–9	14–2	1st	
1993–94	Towson State	21–9	15–3	1st	
1994–95	Towson State	12–15	6–10	7th	
Towson State Tigers (North Atlantic / America East Conference) (1995–1997)
1995–96	Towson State	16–12	11–7	T–3rd	
1996–97	Towson State	9–19	5–13	T–9th	
Towson State:		202–203 (.499)	112–98 (.533)		
Total:		202–203 (.499)			
National champion Postseason invitational champion Conference regular season champion Conference regular season and conference tournament champion Division regular season champion Division regular season and conference tournament champion Conference tournament champion
