= Kurk Lee =

American basketball player (born 1967)

Personal information
- Born: June 3, 1967 (age 59) Baltimore, Maryland, U.S.
- Listed height: 190 cm (6 ft 3 in)
- Listed weight: 86 kg (190 lb)

Career information
- High school: Calvert Hall (Towson, Maryland) Paul Laurence Dunbar (Baltimore, Maryland)
- College: Western Kentucky (1985–1987); Towson State (1988–1990)
- NBA draft: 1990: undrafted
- Playing career: 1990–2002
- Position: Point guard
- Number: 20

Career history
- 1990–1991: New Jersey Nets
- 1992: Winnipeg Thunder
- 1995–1998: Torpan Pojat
- 1999: ÍA
- 1999–2000: Baltimore Bayrunners
- 2000–2001: Richmond Rhythm
- 2001: TTÜ-A. Le Coq
- 2002: Pussihukat

Career highlights
- 3× Korisliiga champion (1996–1998); 2× Finnish Basketball Cup (1996, 1997); Korisliiga Foreign player of the year (1997); 2× ECC Player of the Year (1989, 1990); 2× First-team All-ECC (1989, 1990); ECC tournament MVP (1990)
- Stats at NBA.com
- Stats at Basketball Reference

Marvin Kurk Lee (born June 3, 1967) is a retired American professional basketball player. He spent one season in the NBA, for the New Jersey Nets in 1990–91. He won three straight Finnish championships as a member of Torpan Pojat from 1996 to 1998 and was named the Korisliiga Foreign player of the year in 1997.

== College career ==
A 6-foot-3-inch (1.91 m) and 190-pound (86 kg) guard born in Baltimore, Maryland, he played collegiately at both Western Kentucky University and Towson State University. The first Towson alumnus to play in the National Basketball Association, Kurk Lee '90 was inducted into the Towson Hall of Fame in 2000. He made a huge impact on the Tiger program in his two years at Towson.

A native of Baltimore, he led the Tigers to their first two winning seasons at the NCAA Division I level in 1988–89 and 1989–90. In the 1988–89 season, he was the East Coast Conference Player of the Year, the first Tiger so honored. He led the league in scoring with a 25.4 average and finished 13th in the NCAA Division I.

Honored as the ECC Player of the Week five times, he was an honorable mention All-America selection. He led the Tigers to a 19–10 overall record and a second-place finish in the ECC. He also led the ECC in steals and free throw percentage while averaging 5.6 rebounds per game.

In two seasons, he scored 1,514 points and finished his career as the Tigers’ fourth leading career scorer.

In 1990–91, he made the New Jersey Nets as an undrafted free agent. He appeared in 33 games for the Nets, scoring 1.4 points per game. After one season with the Nets, he played for Oklahoma City in the Continental Basketball Association for one year.

He returned to the Baltimore area and played for the Baltimore Bay Runners of the International Basketball League. With the Bay Runners, he was reunited with Terry Truax, his college coach at Towson. He was one of the top performers for the Bay Runners and led the IBL in free throw percentage.

== Playing career ==
Lee signed as a free agent with the New Jersey Nets in 1990 and played sparingly in 48 games during the 1990–91 NBA season, averaging 1.4 points per game. In 1992 Lee Played for the Winnipeg Thunder of the World Basketball League. He was signed by the Miami Heat in the offseason of 1993, but was waived prior to the start of the 1993–94 season.

Lee has also played in the Continental Basketball Association, International Basketball League and in the Philippines, Turkey, Finland and Estonia.

He returned to the Baltimore area and played for the Baltimore Bay Runners of the International Basketball League. While playing with the Bay Runners, he was reunited with his coach from Towson, Terry Truax. Lee was one of the top players for the Baltimore Bay runners and led the IBL in free throw percentage.

Lee played for Torpan Pojat in the Korisliiga from 1995 to December 1998, where he won the Finnish championship three times and the Finnish Cup twice. In 1997 he was named the Korisliiga Foreign player of the year.

In January 1999, he signed with ÍA of the Icelandic Úrvalsdeild karla. In 8 games for the club, Lee averaged 32.4 points, 12.1 rebounds and 5.8 assists.

He spent the first half of the 2001–2002 season with TTÜ-A. Le Coq in the Estonian Korvpalli Meistriliiga. The team released him in December and in January he returned to Finland and signed with Pussihukat. In 15 games for the club, he averaged 12.0 points and 4.9 rebounds.

He retired from professional basketball in April, 2002.

== Personal life ==
His son, Kurk Lee Jr, plays collegiate basketball at Drexel University.

Lee was also honored with the IBL's first Community Service Man of the Year award. He has done community service in the Baltimore area since his graduation in 1990. He has been active in the Special Olympics and conducts many camps and clinics in the off-season. He has also been the basketball coach at Southside Academy while serving as a substitute teacher at Southside.
