= Devin Boyd =

American basketball player (born 1970)

Personal information
- Born: September 13, 1970 (age 56)
- Listed height: 6 ft 1 in (1.85 m)
- Listed weight: 185 lb (84 kg)

Career information
- High school: Walbrook (Baltimore, Maryland)
- College: Towson (1988–1993)
- NBA draft: 1993: undrafted
- Position: Point guard

Career highlights
- ECC Player of the Year (1991); First-team All-Big South (1993); First-team All-ECC (1991); ECC Rookie of the Year (1989)

Devin Lemuel Boyd (born September 13, 1970) is an American former basketball player known for his college career at Towson University from 1988 to 1993. He was a two-time all-conference performer and the 1991 East Coast Conference Player of the Year as a junior. Through the 2021–22 season, Boyd is still Towson's all-time leader for career points (2,000) and assists (438) and is second all-time in steals (264).

== College career ==
Boyd is a native of Baltimore, Maryland and attended the Walbrook High School. He earned Second Team All-Metro honors as a junior and then All-Metro First Team as a senior. Towson University offered him a basketball scholarship, and so in 1988 Boyd enrolled to play for the Tigers.

In his freshman season of 1988–89, Boyd averaged 13.7 points, 4.8 assists, and 2.0 steals per game. The Tigers finished in second place in the East Coast Conference (ECC) with a 10–4 conference record and Boyd was named the ECC Rookie of the Year. He followed that year with a slight dip in production during his sophomore campaign in which his averages dropped to 11.7 points, 3.9 assists, and 1.7 steals per game. Towson was the regular season and ECC tournament champion, however, and earned the school's first ever berth into the NCAA tournament, where they lost in the first round to Oklahoma.

As a junior in 1990–91, Boyd earned an All-ECC First Team honor and was named the ECC Player of the Year. He led the Tigers to second consecutive ECC regular season and ECC tournament championships, plus another berth into the NCAA tournament where they would lose in the first round to Ohio State. Boyd's 20.7 points and 2.9 steals per game both led the East Coast Conference. He also added 3.1 rebounds and 3.4 assists per game. The following year, Boyd fractured his elbow in the first game of the season, requiring him to redshirt (sit out) his natural senior season.

Boyd returned in 1992–93 as a redshirt senior. It was also Towson's first year as a member of the Big South Conference. He averaged career-highs of 23.0 points and 3.9 rebounds per game, plus 3.0 assists and 2.6 steals. In the regular season's final game, Boyd scored a career-high 46 points in a double overtime win over UMBC, which is still the second best single-game performance in Towson history. Boyd was named to the All-Big South First Team after leading the Tigers to win the regular season title.

He finished his collegiate career with 2,000 points, 337 rebounds, 438 assists, and 264 steals. Through the 2021–22 season, Boyd is still Towson's career leader in points and steals, and is second in assists. In 2004, Towson University inducted him into their athletics hall of fame.

== Later life ==
Boyd never played professional basketball. He became a special education teacher at Walbrook High School from 1996 to 1999 and was popular amongst the students. In 1999, he was arrested in Catonsville, Maryland after 60 grams of crack cocaine were found in his apartment. Previous criminal history included being charged with a third-degree sex offense involving a 15-year-old foster child in his brother's care as well as a failure to appear in court over a 1994 sexual assault case in which he was involved. In 2012, Boyd opened a restaurant called Love Grill.
