= East Coast Conference (Division I) Men's Basketball Player of the Year =

East Coast Conference Men's Basketball Player of the Year
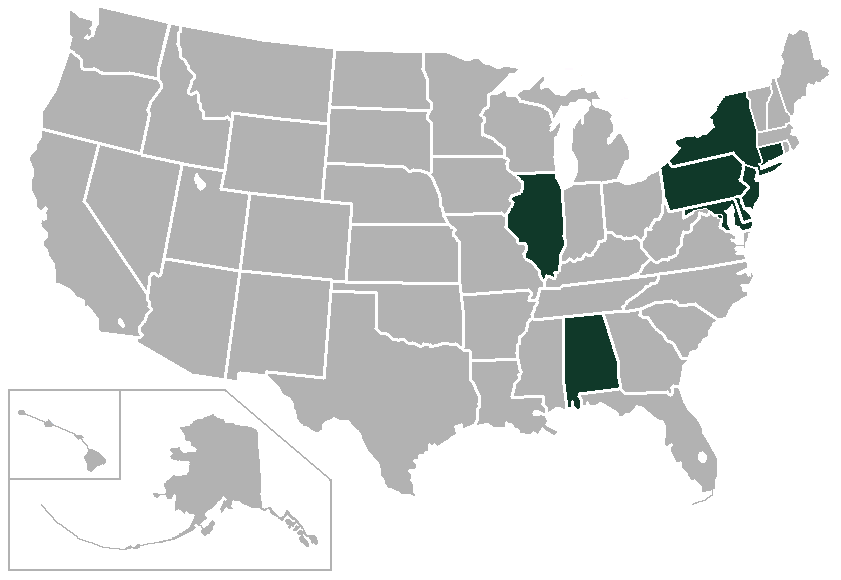
- Awarded for: the most outstanding basketball player in the East Coast Conference
- Country: United States

History
- First award: 1975
- Final award: 1994

The East Coast Conference Men's Basketball Player of the Year was an award given to the East Coast Conference's most outstanding player. The award was first given following the 1974–75 season and was discontinued after the league folded following the 1993–94 season. In 1994 the East Coast Conference was absorbed into the Mid-Continent Conference, now known as the Summit League.

There were two ties in the award's history, 1982 and 1987. In its first year, the ECC named players of the year for each division — with Wilbur Thomas of American named the East Player of the Year and Henry Horne of Lafayette winning the West award.

One player, Michael Brooks of La Salle, won the award three times (1978–1980) and was also named the national player of the year in 1980. Two others, Michael Anderson of Drexel and Kurk Lee of Towson, won the award twice.

== Key ==
†	Co-Players of the Year
*	Awarded a national player of the year award that same season: Helms Foundation College Basketball Player of the Year (1904–05 to 1978–79); UPI College Basketball Player of the Year (1954–55 to 1995–96); Oscar Robertson Trophy (1958–59 to present); Naismith College Player of the Year (1968–69 to present); John R. Wooden Award (1976–77 to present)
Player (X)	Denotes the number of times the player has been awarded the ECC Player of the Year award at that point

== Winners ==
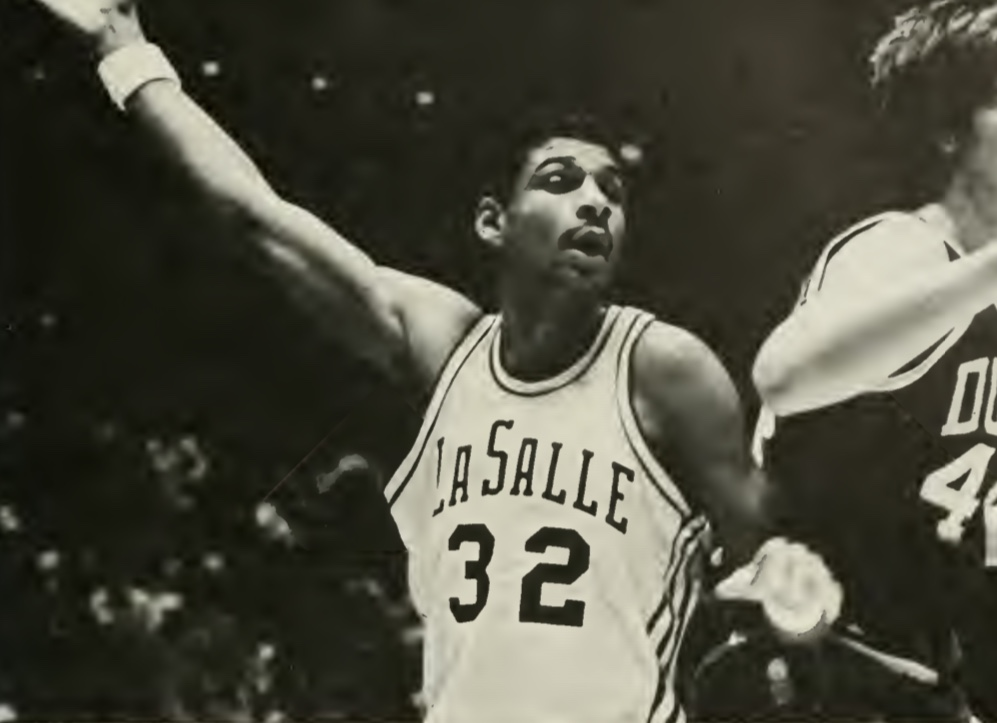
Michael Brooks of La Salle won the award three times, from 1978 to 1980.

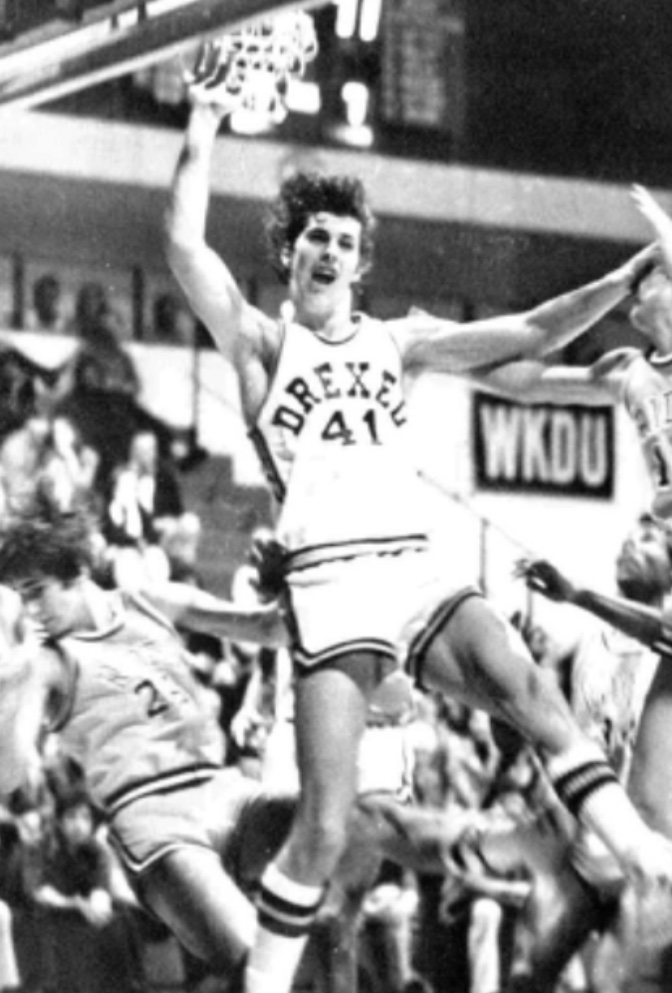
Len Hatzenbeller of Drexel won in 1981.

Season	Player	School	Position	Class	Reference
1974–75^{†}	Henry Horne	Lafayette	PF / C	Senior	
1974–75^{†}	Wilbur Thomas	American	PF / SF	Senior	
1975–76	Todd Tripucka	Lafayette	SG	Senior	
1976–77	Rich Laurel	Hofstra	SF	Senior	
1977–78	Michael Brooks	La Salle	SF	Sophomore	
1978–79	Michael Brooks (2)	La Salle	SF	Junior	
1979–80	Michael Brooks* (3)	La Salle	SF	Senior	
1980–81	Len Hatzenbeller	Drexel	C	Senior	
1981–82^{†}	Granger Hall	Temple	C	Sophomore	
1981–82^{†}	Mark Nickens	American	SG	Junior	
1982–83	David Taylor	Hofstra	PF	Senior	
1983–84	Richard Congo	Drexel	PF	Senior	
1984–85	Jaye Andrews	Bucknell	SG / SF	Senior	
1985–86	Michael Anderson	Drexel	PG	Sophomore	
1986–87^{†}	Daren Queenan	Lehigh	SF	Junior	
1986–87^{†}	Ron Simpson	Rider	SF	Junior	
1987–88	Michael Anderson (2)	Drexel	PG	Senior	
1988–89	Kurk Lee	Towson	SG	Junior	
1989–90	Kurk Lee (2)	Towson	SG	Senior	
1990–91	Devin Boyd	Towson	PG	Junior	
1991–92	Terrance Jacobs	Towson	PG / SG	Senior	
1992–93	East Coast Conference temporarily disbanded				
1993–94	Reggie Smith	Northeastern Illinois	SG / SF	Senior	

== Winners by school ==
School (year joined)	Winners	Years
Drexel (1958)	4	1981, 1984, 1986, 1988
Towson (1982)	4	1989, 1990, 1991, 1992
La Salle (1958)	3	1978, 1979, 1980
American (1965)	2	1975^{†}, 1982^{†}
Hofstra (1965)	2	1977, 1983
Lafayette (1958)	2	1975^{†}, 1976
Bucknell (1958)	1	1985
Lehigh (1958)	1	1987^{†}
Northeastern Illinois (1993)	1	1994
Rider (1966)	1	1987^{†}
Temple (1958)	1	1982^{†}
Brooklyn (1991)^{[a]}	0	—
Buffalo (1991)^{[a]}	0	—
Central Connecticut (1990)^{[a]}	0	—
Chicago State (1993)^{[a]}	0	—
Delaware (1958)^{[b]}	0	—
Saint Joseph's (1958)^{[b]}	0	—
Troy (1993)^{[a]}	0	—
UMBC (1990)^{[a]}	0	—
West Chester (1969)^{[b]}	0	—

- ^{[a]} These schools were not charter members of the ECC and instead joined later. Brooklyn and UMBC left in 1992, while Buffalo, Central Connecticut, Chicago State, and Troy left in 1994 once the ECC permanently disbanded.
- ^{[b]} Delaware, Saint Joseph's, and West Chester were original members of the newly chartered ECC in 1974, having split off with the rest of the schools from the Middle Atlantic Conferences. Saint Joseph's and West Chester left in 1982, while Delaware left in 1991.
