= Drexel Dragons men's basketball =

Men's college basketball team

2026–27 Drexel Dragons men's basketball team
- University: Drexel University
- First season: 1894–95 132 years ago
- Athletic director: Maisha Kelly
- Head coach: Zach Spiker (11th season)
- Location: Philadelphia, Pennsylvania
- Arena: Daskalakis Athletic Center (capacity: 2,509)
- Conference: Coastal Athletic Association
- Nickname: Dragons
- Colors: Navy blue and gold
- Student section: DAC Pack
- All-time record: 1,406–1,244 (.531) (through 2025–26 season)

NCAA Division I tournament round of 32
- 1957*, 1960*, 1966*, 1967*, 1996

NCAA Division I tournament appearances
- 1957*, 1960*, 1966*, 1967*, 1986, 1994, 1995, 1996, 2021

Conference tournament champions
- 1960, 1967, 1986, 1994, 1995, 1996, 2021

Conference regular-season champions
- 1954, 1955, 1956, 1957, 1959, 1960, 1961, 1963, 1964, 1965, 1966, 1967, 1986, 1993, 1994, 1995, 1996, 1999, 2012

Uniforms
Home	Away	Alternate
- * at Division II level

The Drexel Dragons men's basketball program represents intercollegiate men's basketball at Drexel University. The team currently competes in the Coastal Athletic Association in Division I of the National Collegiate Athletic Association (NCAA) and plays home games at the Daskalakis Athletic Center in Philadelphia, Pennsylvania. Drexel last appeared in the NCAA tournament in 2021.

== Rivalries ==
The Dragons, a member of the City 6, have rivalries with multiple institutions, these include La Salle University, Temple University, University of Pennsylvania, Saint Joseph's University, and Villanova University.

The most notable rivalry Drexel has is with Penn, nicknamed Battle of 33rd Street, one of the closest rivalries geographically.

== History ==
According to Basketball-Reference.com, Drexel was the 5th US school to start up collegiate basketball, their first season being 1894–1895. Drexel's first basketball game was played against Temple College on November 22, 1894, which Drexel won by a score of 26–1. The Dragons joined Division I in 1974. Drexel has received bids to five NCAA basketball tournaments in 1986, 1994, 1995, 1996, and 2021. During the 1996 tournament, Malik Rose led the team to their only second round appearance after an upset of fifth-seeded Memphis. Prior to this, Drexel had appeared in four Division II NCAA tournaments in 1957, 1960, 1966 and 1967, including the very first Division II tournament in 1957. Drexel's men's basketball team was ranked as high as 35th nationally in 2007, finishing the season with a 23–9 record while making the National Invitational Tournament for the fourth time in the prior five years.

On February 22, 2018, Drexel came back from a 34 point deficit (trailing 53–19 at one point), coming back to defeat Delaware 85–83 to complete the largest comeback in Division I history.

=== Venues ===
==== Main Building ====
Beginning in 1894, Drexel played their games and held all athletic activities in a gymnasium that was located in the 4th floor of the Main Building. This gymnasium was sometimes referenced as West Philadelphia College Court.

==== Curtis Hall Gymnasium ====
In 1929, Curtis Hall, an extension of Drexel Main Building, was completed and included a new gymnasium. The gymnasium was prioritized in construction to be completed 3 months before the rest of the building, in December 1928, in order to be completed prior to the start of the 1928–29 Drexel basketball season. The gym featured a full-sized basketball floor, and separate locker rooms for the home and visiting teams. This gym is known as Curtis Hall Gym, or Curtis Gym, and was also nicknamed "The Band Box." During construction of Curtis Hall, an entrance was added on Chestnut Street to allow quicker access to the gym. The gymnasium had a seating capacity of 500. After moving home games to Sayre Junior High School, games were played in Curtis Hall again for one last season in 1953–1954, before they once again were relocated back to the high school.

==== Sayre Junior High School ====
As the popularity of the basketball and other sports teams grew, Curtis Hall Gym became less suitable for hosting the games. During the 1951–52 season, Drexel decided to move 3 of its 4 remaining league games to Sayre Junior High School, located in West Philadelphia. Drexel also played 6 of its 9 home games at the high school in the following 1952–1953 season. A single home games were scheduled at Curtis Hall in the 1953–1954 season, however the remaining home games would be played at Sayre High School. From that point forward, Sayre Junior High School served the home court for Drexel through the 1968–1969 season.

==== Drexel Armory ====
Beginning in the 1969–1970 basketball season, the Drexel home basketball games were moved to the 32nd Street Armory, also known as the Drexel Armory. Drexel first began holding various athletic and recreational activities in the armory in 1947, while the building was still state owned and used exclusively for National Guard and ROTC drills. While home games were moved out of the Armory after the 1974–1975 season, the armory was considered for renovation in the 2010s in order to make it suitable for hosting home basketball games. Instead, renovations were made at Daskalakis Athletic Center, allowing the DAC to continue to serve as the home court.

==== Daskalakis Athletic Center ====
Since the 1975–1976 season, the Dragons' home games have been played at the Daskalakis Athletic Center, formerly known as the Physical Education and Athletic Center (PEAC). While it was considered to move the games back to the Armory at one point, Drexel instead decided to renovate the Athletic Center beginning in 2012 and keep the games there instead. Within the Daskalakis Athletic Center, games are played on Sam Cozen Court in the main gym.

==== Other Venues ====
Drexel previously held a number of home games at other local venues in Philadelphia. In the 1952–53 season when 6 of Drexel's 9 home games were played at Sayre Junior High School, 2 home games were played at Philadelphia Convention Hall (as was one game the previous season), and the final game was played at St. Joseph's Field House. In the 1950s and 1960s a number of Drexel home games were also played in The Palestra.

Since moving to the Armory in the 1969–1970 season, it has become rare for home games to be played at alternative venues. In the 1995–96 season, Drexel played their first game at the CoreStates Spectrum in Philadelphia against conference rival Delaware, however it was considered a neutral site game. In the 2015–16 season Drexel played what was considered a home game against Penn State at The Palestra, and also played a home game at The Palestra against Temple in the 2018–19 season. However, in many seasons, Drexel has played games at the Palestra that were considered a neutral game statistically, even while serving as a seldom used "home" court for the team's higher demand games. For example, on January 21, 1987, Drexel beat No. 18 ranked Navy at the Palestra, which was considered a neutral site (rather than an alternate home court) according to NCAA records. In the 1987–88 season, Drexel played 3 games at the Palestra that were considered at home. The designation of the Palestra being a neutral site or an alternate home court has varied over the years.

== Postseason results ==
=== NCAA Division I Tournament results ===
The Dragons have appeared in the NCAA Division I tournament five times. Their combined record is 1–5.

Year	Seed	Round	Opponent	Result
1986	15	First round	(2) Louisville	L 73–93
1994	13	First round	(4) Temple	L 39–61
1995	13	First round	(4) Oklahoma State	L 49–73
1996	12	First round Second Round	(5) Memphis (4) Syracuse	W 75–63; L 58–69
2021	16	First round	(1) Illinois	L 49–78

=== NCAA Division II Tournament results ===
The Dragons have appeared in the NCAA Division II tournament four times. Their combined record is 0–7.

Year	Round	Opponent	Result
1957	First round	Rider	L 61–63
1960	Regional semifinals Regional 3rd-place game	Fairfield; Upsala	L 44–56; L 69–74
1966	Regional semifinals Regional 3rd-place game	Long Island; Albright	L 54–62; L 61–78
1967	Regional semifinals Regional 3rd-place game	Cheyney; Wagner	L 53–75; L 53–61

=== NIT results ===
The Dragons have appeared in the National Invitation Tournament (NIT) six times. Their combined record is 2–6.

Year	Round	Opponent	Result
1997	First round	Bradley	L 53–66
2003	Opening Round	Temple	L 59–68
2004	First round	Villanova	L 70–85
2005	Opening Round	Buffalo	L 76–81
2007	First round	NC State	L 56–63
2012	First round Second Round; Quarterfinals	UCF; Northern Iowa; Massachusetts	W 81–56; W 65–63; L 70–72

== Honors ==
=== Retired jerseys ===
Drexel has retired two jersey numbers.

Drexel Dragons retired numbers
No.	Player	Position	Career
00	Malik Rose	PF	1992–1996
10	Michael Anderson	PG	1983–1988

=== Coaching awards ===
ECC Coach Of The Year

- Ray Haesler (1975–76)
- Eddie Burke (1985–86)

AEC Coach Of The Year

- Bill Herrion (4) (1992–93, 1994–95, 1995–96, 1998–99)

CAA Coach Of The Year

- Bruiser Flint (4) (2001–02, 2003–04, 2008–09, 2011–12)

Philadelphia Big 5 Coach Of The Year

- Zach Spiker (2023–24)

=== Player awards ===
ECC Player of the Year

- Len Hatzenbeller (1980–81)
- Richard Congo (1983–84)
- Michael Anderson (2) (1985–86, 1987–88)

AEC Player of the Year

- Malik Rose (2) (1994–95, 1995–96)

ECC Rookie of the Year

- Bob Stephens (1975–76)
- Randy Burkert (1978–79)
- John Rankin (1985–86)

AEC Rookie of the Year

- Mike DeRocckis (1995–96)
- Joe Linderman (1996–97)

CAA Rookie of the Year

- Chris Fouch (2009–10)
- Damion Lee (2011–12)
- Camren Wynter (2018–19)

CAA Defensive Player of the Year

- Robert Battle (2) (2001–02, 2002–03)
- Bashir Mason (2003–04)
- Chaz Crawford (2006–07)
- Amari Williams (3) (2021–22, 2022–23, 2023–24)

== See also ==
- Drexel Dragons women's basketball
