= Lafayette Leopards men's basketball =

2025–26 Lafayette Leopards men's basketball team
- College: Lafayette College
- First season: 1900-01; 126 years ago
- Head coach: Mike McGarvey (3rd season)
- Location: Easton, Pennsylvania, U.S.
- Arena: Kirby Sports Center (capacity: 3,500)
- Conference: Patriot
- Nickname: Leopards
- Colors: Maroon and white

NCAA Division I tournament Sweet Sixteen
- 1957

NCAA Division I tournament appearances
- 1957, 1999, 2000, 2015

Conference tournament champions
- 1999, 2000, 2015

Conference regular-season champions
- Middle Atlantic Conference: 1946, 1949; Mid-3: 1950, 1952; ECC: 1970, 1971, 1973, 1975, 1976, 1977, 1978, 1980, 1981, 1988; Patriot League: 1998, 1999, 2000

Conference division champions
- 2021

Uniforms
Home	Away

The Lafayette Leopards men's basketball team represents Lafayette College in Easton, Pennsylvania in NCAA Division I competition. The school's team competes in the Patriot League and plays home games in Kirby Sports Center. Fran O'Hanlon is the winningest coach in program history. The Leopards are currently coached by Mike McGarvey since his appointment on March 29, 2023. Lafayette has appeared four times in the NCAA Division I men's basketball tournament, most recently in 2015.

== History ==
Basketball gained popularity at Lafayette following World War II. Up until that point, Lafayette's teams were competitive but did not achieve much national or regional distinction. Pete Carril, the legendary hall of fame coach of the Princeton Tigers, played for the Leopards in the late 1940s and early 1950s. Lafayette was coached during the era by Butch Van Breda Kolff, the first coaching job of the future Princeton Final Four and Los Angeles Lakers coach. Van Breda Kolff led the Leopards to their first postseason appearance, the 1955 National Invitation Tournament. The NIT was considered the more prestigious postseason tournament at the time, possibly because all games were played at Madison Square Garden. The Leopards fell to Niagara University in the first round. Under new head coach George Davidson, the Leopards returned to the NIT in 1956, where they fell to St. Francis (NY).

The Leopards qualified for their third straight postseason tournament the following year, but were invited to the 1957 NCAA Tournament instead. Lafayette received the first seed in the seven team Eastern Regional, but fell to Syracuse University 75–71 in the semifinals at the Palestra.

Lafayette basketball re-emerged as a power in the late 1960s under Hal Wissel, a future NBA and Division II national championship coach. Wissel was responsible for recruiting the best player in Lafayette history, Tracy Tripucka. Tracy went on to score 1,973 points, the most in Lafayette history, while leading the Leopards to its first postseason victory. In the 1972 NIT, Jay Mottola sunk a free throw with three seconds left to upset the University of Virginia. Lafayette was eliminated in the next round by Jacksonville University. Aside from being the all-time leading scorer, Tracy was profiled in a Sports Illustrated article. Following the season, he was selected in the 1972 NBA draft by the New York Knicks. The 1972 squad was coached by Tom Davis, a future longtime coach of the University of Iowa. Future national champion head coach Gary Williams of the University of Maryland was an assistant on Davis' Lafayette staff.

Another Tripucka, Tracy's younger brother Todd, led the Leopards to the 1975 NIT, where Lafayette lost to St. John's University (New York). Todd Tripucka was second in all-time leading scoring behind his brother before being surpassed by Phil Ness in 1978. Todd Tripucka ranks sixth all-time in scoring as of 2012. The Leopards returned to the NIT in 1980, but were defeated by the University of Virginia.

Legendary coach van Breda Kolff returned to coach the Leopards in 1984 and orchestrated one of the most dynamic upsets in Lafayette basketball history. In an unusual decision, the University of Notre Dame, coached by Digger Phelps and coming off of a sweet sixteen appearance in 1987, traveled to the Kirby Sports Center for a nationally televised game. The Leopards dominated 83–68 as Otis Ellis, Lafayette's second all-time leading scorer behind Tracy Tripucka, scored a career high 35 points. Notre Dame qualified for 1988 NCAA Tournament.

The Leopards returned to the NCAA Tournament under current coach Fran O'Hanlon in 1999 and 2000. The Leopards were the first basketball team to ever return two conference players of the year from two different seasons (Stefan Ciocisi and Brian Ehlers). The Leopards were seeded 15 both seasons and fell to Miami and Temple. The 2000 season was the subject of The Last Amateurs, a book by nationally acclaimed author John Feinstein.

Up until 2006, Lafayette was the only team outside of the Ivy League that did not award athletic scholarships in men's basketball. Other Patriot League teams did not award scholarships, but the policy was gradually dropped by fellow Patriot League schools, leaving Lafayette the lone hold out. With a full scholarship team, the Leopards returned the Patriot League Championship in 2010 for the first time since 2000 and fell to Lehigh. Lafayette lost the 2011 championship game to Bucknell, but the Leopards' double overtime buzzer-beater by Jim Mower against American University in the semifinals was highlighted as a top ten play on ESPN. The Leopards finally won the 2015 Patriot League men's basketball tournament, and reached the NCAA Tournament for the first time since 2000.

== Postseason results ==
=== NCAA tournament results ===
The Leopards have appeared in four NCAA Tournaments. Their combined record is 0–5.

Year	Round	Seed	Opponent	Result
1957	Regional semifinal Regional Third Place	N/A	Syracuse; Canisius	L 71–75; L 76–82
1999	First round	#15	#2 Miami (FL)	L 54–75
2000	First round	#15	#2 Temple	L 47–73
2015	First Round	#16	#1 Villanova	L 52–93

=== NIT results ===
The Leopards have appeared in five National Invitation Tournaments. Their combined record is 1–5.

Year	Round	Opponent	Result
1955	First round	Niagara	L 70–83
1956	First round	St. Francis (NY)	L 74–85
1972	First round Quarterfinals	Virginia; Jacksonville	W 72–71; L 76–87
1975	First round	St. John's	L 76–94
1980	First round	Virginia	L 56–67

== Notable alumni ==
=== Conference players of the year ===
- East Coast Conference POY
  - Henry Horne (1975)
  - Todd Tripucka (1976)
- Patriot League POY
  - Stefan Ciosici (1998)
  - Brian Ehlers (1999, 2000)
