= Shrubbery =

Area in a garden where shrubs are thickly planted

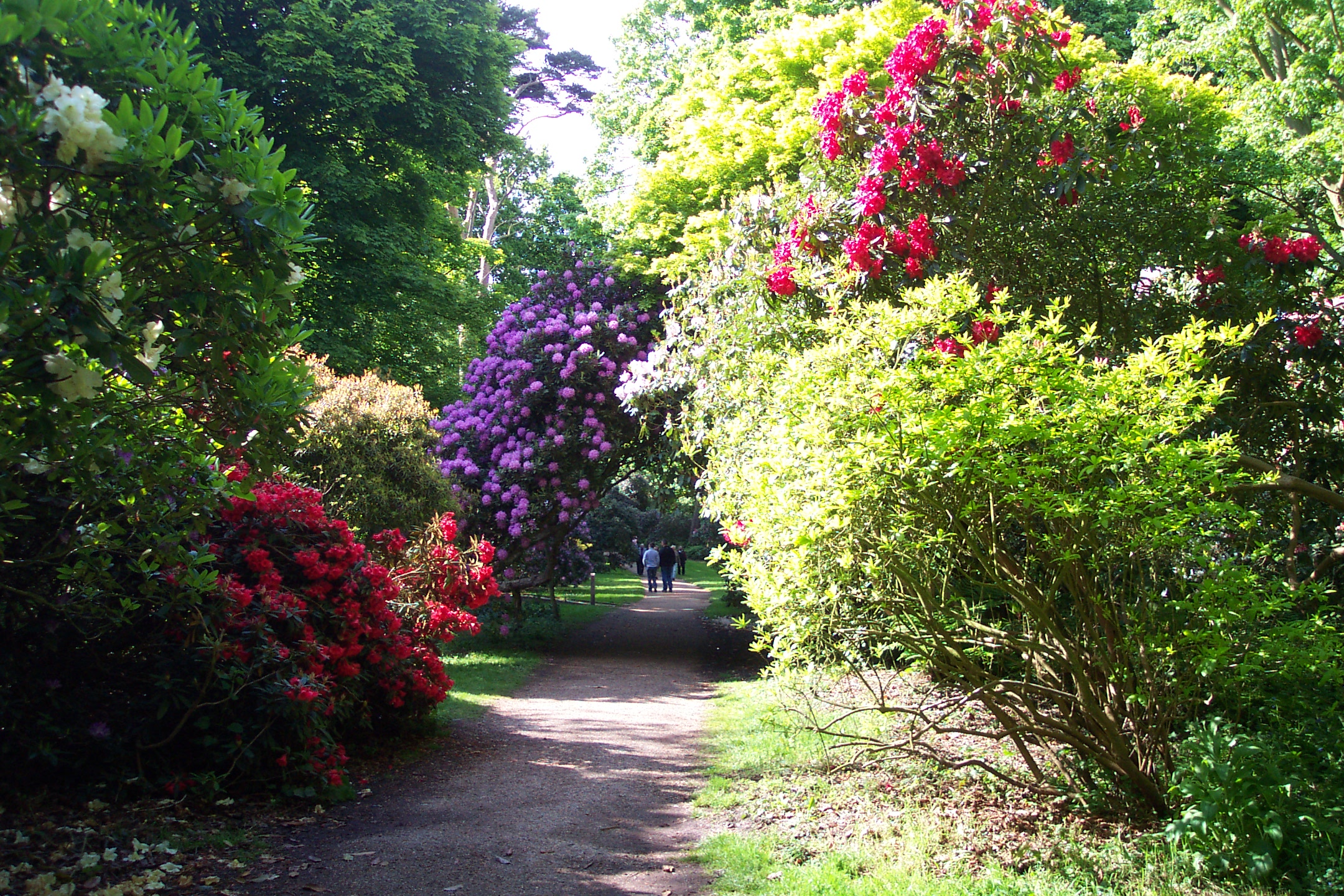
Rhododendron garden, Sheringham Park, originally a country house garden by Humphry Repton, with many species collected by Ernest Henry Wilson a century later

A shrubbery, shrub border or shrub garden is a part of a garden where shrubs, mostly flowering species, are thickly planted. The original shrubberies were mostly sections of large gardens, with one or more paths winding through it, a less-remembered aspect of the English landscape garden with very few original 18th-century examples surviving. As the fashion spread to smaller gardens, linear shrub borders covered up walls and fences, and were typically underplanted with smaller herbaceous flowering plants. By the late 20th century, shrubs, trees and smaller plants tend to be mixed together in the most visible parts of the garden, hopefully blending successfully. At the same time, shrubs, especially very large ones, have become part of the woodland garden, mixed in with trees, both native species and imported ornamental varieties.

The word is first recorded by the OED in a letter of 1748 by Henrietta Knight, Lady Luxborough to the fanatical gardener William Shenstone: "Nature has been so remarkably kind this last Autumn to adorn my Shrubbery with the flowers that usually blow at Whitsuntide". The shrubbery developed to display exciting new imported flowering species, initially mostly from the East Coast of British America, and quickly replaced the older formal "wilderness", with compartments of smaller trees surrounded by hedges, and little colour. It was a further part of the garden, beyond the terrace and flower garden that the house usually opened onto, and when mature provided shade on hot days, some shelter from wind, and some privacy.

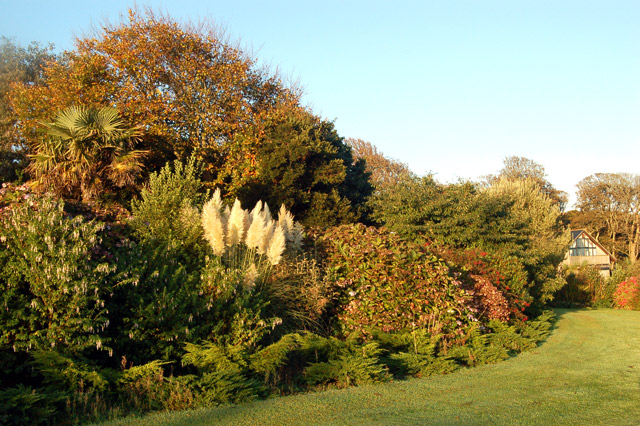
"Graduated" planting in a shrub border in Cornwall

The shrubbery was at first the development of the plant collector wing of the growing movement of English gardeners, who in the early and mid-18th century eagerly awaited the new seeds and cuttings arriving at London nurserymen such as Thomas Fairchild (d. 1729) from America. There was some tension between them and the more landscape-oriented gardeners such as Capability Brown, though Brown's designs in fact allowed for flower gardens and shrubberies, which have very rarely survived as well as his landscape vistas in the parks.

Shrubbery is also the collective noun for shrubs in other contexts, sometimes used for shrubland, a type of natural landscape dominated by shrubs or bushes. The many distinct types of these include fynbos, maquis, shrub-steppe, shrub swamp and moorland.

== 18th century ==
According to the garden historian Mark Laird, "by the early 1750s, we may reasonably claim that the shrubbery had been invented". The exact appearance of the earliest examples needs careful reconstruction from such plans, letters, poems and visual images as have survived. A high proportion seem to have been viewed from "serpentine" paths, already a very fashionable layout for gardens, using an expanded version of the line of beauty promoted by William Hogarth's book The Analysis of Beauty of 1753. In plans some of these proceed in a single overall direction, with several more or less curves to left and right, and often no exit shown at the end. With large shrubs these would first bring plants into view when fairly close, supplying a succession of surprises. There was great emphasis on "graduation" in planting, with shorter plants, including herbaceous flowers, at the front near the path or lawn, with middle-sized ones behind, and the largest, and any trees, at the back. This principle, to some extent self-evident, has governed much planting ever since, for example that of Gertrude Jekyll, but was rather novel in European gardening at this point, where the different sizes of plants were usually planted in different areas.

== 19th century ==
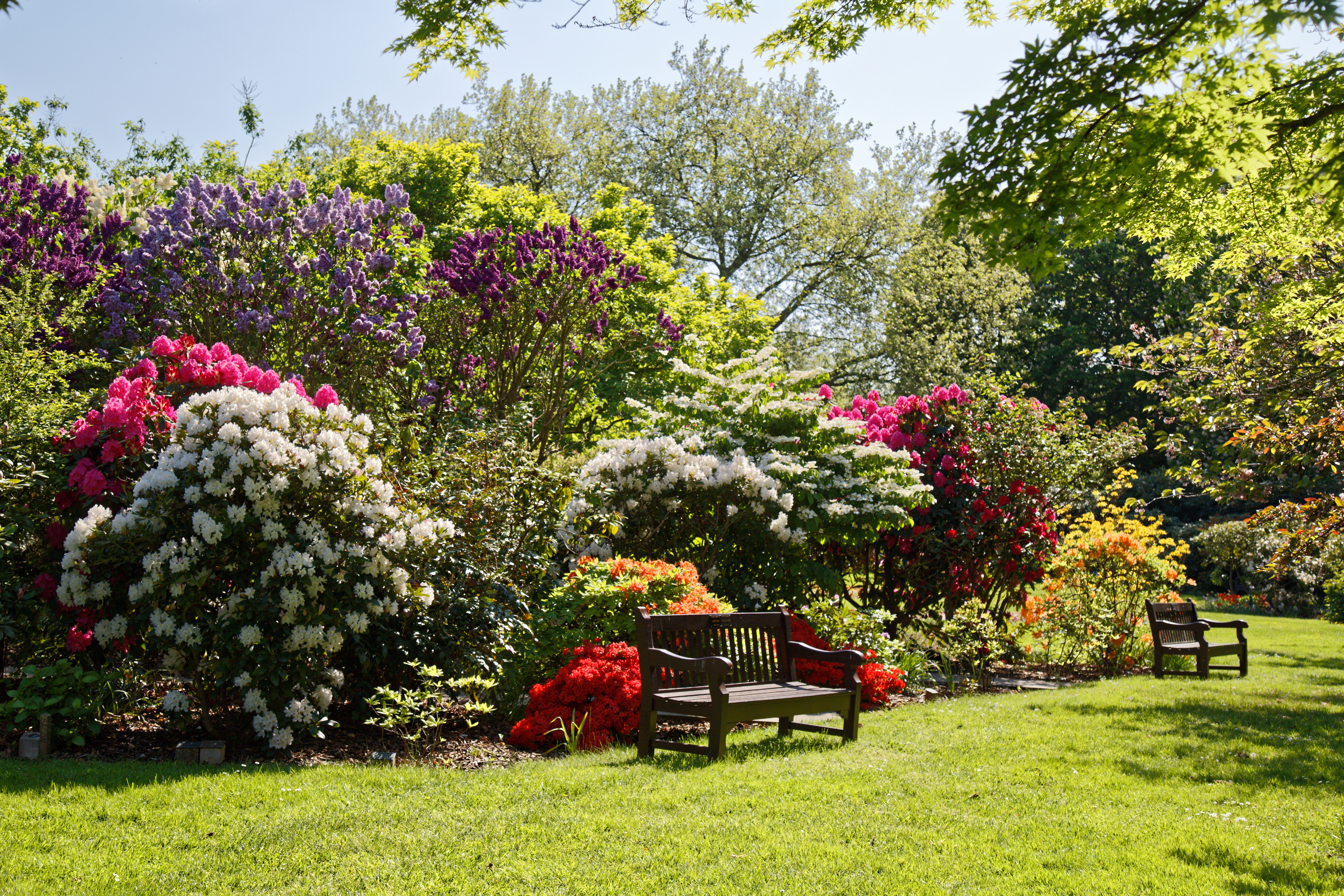
Rhododendrons in the City of London Cemetery

A shrubbery was a feature of 19th-century gardens in the English manner, or the gardenesque style of the early part of the century. A shrubbery was a collection of hardy shrubs, quite distinct from a flower garden, which was also a cutting garden to supply flowers in the house. The shrubbery was arranged as a walk, ideally a winding one, that made a circuit that brought the walker back to the terrace of the house. Its paths were gravel, so that they dried quickly after rain. A walk in the shrubbery offered a chance for a private conversation, and a winding walk among shrubs surrounding even quite a small lawn was a feature of the garden behind a well-furnished Regency suburban villa.

"Mr Rushworth," said Lady Bertram, "if I were you, I would have a very pretty shrubbery. One likes to get out into a shrubbery in fine weather." —Jane Austen, Mansfield Park (1814).

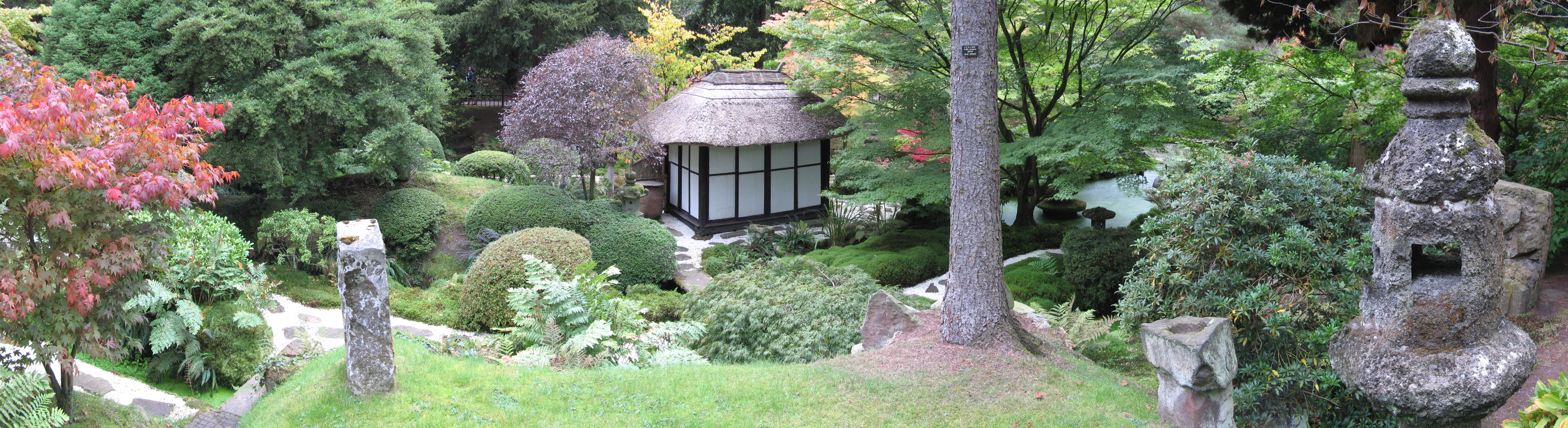
Japanese Garden in the Tatton Park Gardens, England

In the later part of the 19th century hardy Asian shrubs from the hills around the Himalayas and Western China became the most exciting new additions to the European garden, and large Asian rhododendrons now often dominate shrubberies and woodland gardens planted in the period that have not been carefully maintained, especially the invasive rhododendron ponticum. This had a wide range across Asia, extending to southern Spain, and it was introduced to England in the 1760s. But many sections of gardens, mostly from about 1890 to 1950, were planted as "rhododendron gardens" or "azealea gardens" from the start.

A variant on this, from the 1890s onwards, was a European interpretation of the Japanese garden, whose aesthetic was introduced to the English-speaking world by Josiah Conder's Landscape Gardening in Japan (Kelly & Walsh, 1893). Conder was a British architect who had worked for the Japanese government and other clients in Japan from 1877 until his death. The book was published when the general trend of Japonisme, or Japanese influence in the arts of the West, was already well-established, and sparked the first Japanese gardens in the West. Initially these were mostly sections of large private gardens, but as the style grew in popularity, many Japanese gardens were, and continue to be, added to public parks and gardens. These are to a large extent planted with shrubs, as well as small trees.

Technically the rose garden is a specialized type of shrub garden, but it is normally treated as a type of flower garden, if only because its origins in Europe go back to at least the Middle Ages in Europe, when roses were effectively the largest and most popular flowers, already existing in numerous garden cultivars. Roses were never out of fashion, but received a great boost in the 19th century, as many hybrids from Asian species were developed, above all from rosa chinensis (the "China rose"), which is still the dominant parent in most modern garden roses. Large rose gardens became highly popular as features of public parks at the end of the century, and remained popular additions in the 20th. Many rose breeders also show off their plants in gardens at their nurseries.

== 20th century ==
After the turn of the new century Gertrude Jekyll offered a chapter of suggestions for "Wood and Shrubbery Edges" in Colour Schemes for the Flower Garden (London, 1908) in which her descriptions were based on her own garden at Munstead Wood, south of Godalming, Surrey, but her shrubbery and hardy perennial plantings were designed to soften transitions: "Where woodland joins garden ground there is often a sudden jolt; the wood ends with a hard line, sometimes with a path along it, accentuating the defect." In the expansive space of even a small Edwardian garden, Miss Jekyll recommended a space "from twenty-five to forty feet" planted so as to bring wood and garden into harmony, "so planted as to belong equally to garden and wood." Rhododendrons were the stand-by in these shrub belts, combined with ferns, wood-rush, lilies, white foxgloves and white columbines.

== Structural components ==
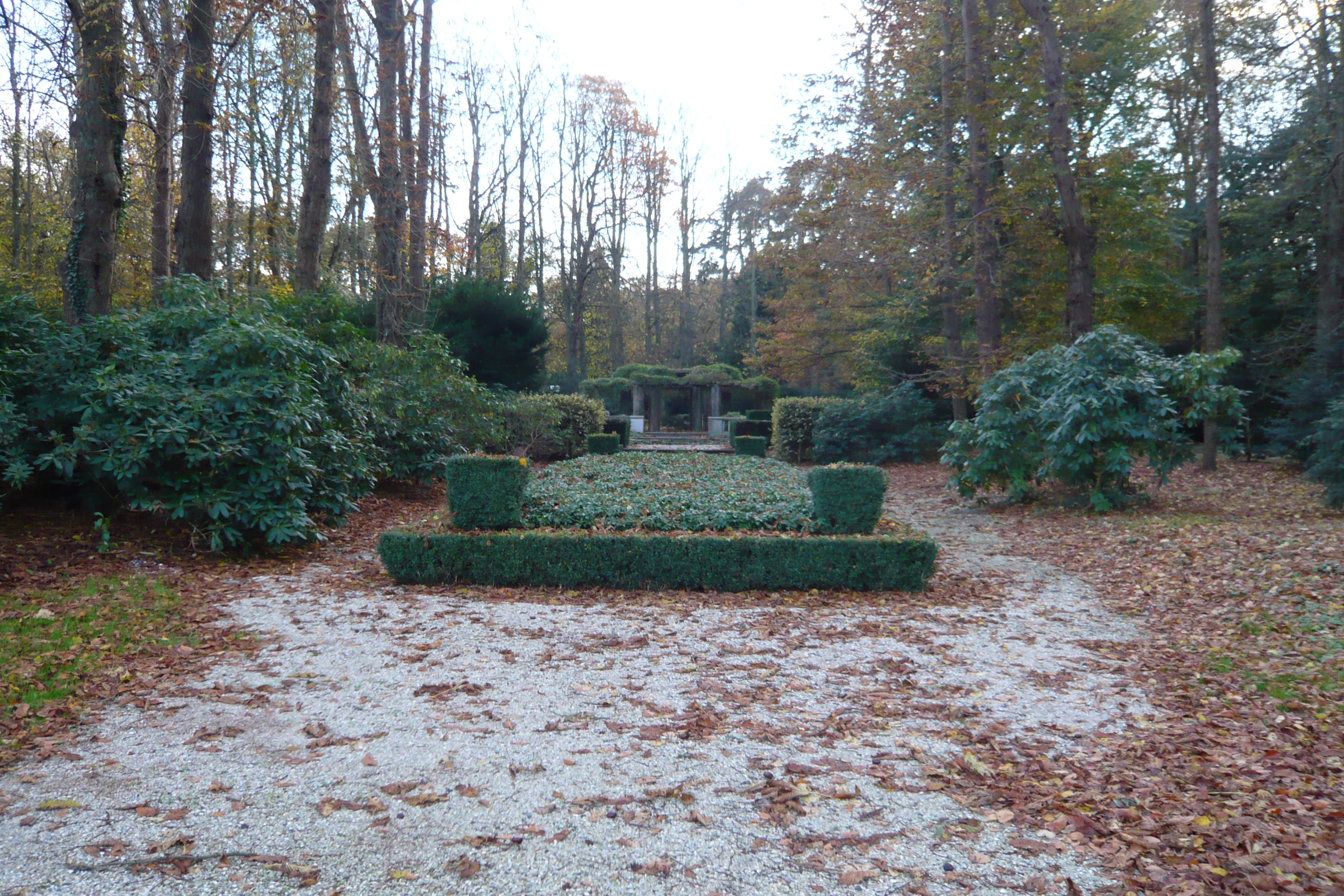
Dutch shrubbery in winter, Kareol, Aerdenhout

In the 1980s John Nash's never-executed plans for the garden setting of the Brighton Pavilion, illustrated in Nash's volume Views of the Royal Pavilion (1826), were finally carried out in connection with the extensive restorations of the Pavilion itself. Its "fairly open landscape of soft lawns dotted with trees and set with lightly-wooded, sinuous shrubberies" are best illustrated in Augustus Charles Pugin's watercolor view c. 1822 of the west front of the Pavilion, reproduced in Nash's publication. The winding perimeter walk circling the lawn among the shrubs and trees, enriched with island beds of herbaceous perennials, began to be laid out in 1814, with a flush of activity 1817-21. Two books of commentaries proved indispensable for the replanting scheme. One was Henry Phillips, who wrote in 1823

The shrubbery is a style of pleasure-garden which seems to owe its creation to the idea that our sublime poet formed of Eden. It originated in England and is as peculiar to the British nation as landscape planting.

The formulas for arranging a shrubbery were founded on contemporary painterly requirements for the Picturesque; judicious contrast and variety were essential, but Philips seems to have been among the first garden writers to notice that yellowish-green leaves in the foreground seem to throw bluish green-leaved shrubs deeper into a perceived distance. The desirable undulations of paths and islands and bands of shrub plantings would ideally undulate in elevation too: "break up the level by throwing up elevations,' Philips suggested, "so as to answer the double purpose of obscuring private walks and screening other parts from the wind."

Nash was at work also on the public parks of London, devising the shrubberies of Regent's Park and of St. James's Park, where the German visitor Prince Pückler-Muskau discerned that

Mr Nash ... masses the shrubs more closely together, allows the grass to disappear in wide sweeps under the plants or lets it run along the edges of the shrubs without trimming them ... hence they soon develop into a thicket that gracefully bends over the lawn without showing anywhere a sharply defined outline

Such precise effects were made immeasurably simpler by the invention in 1827 by the English engineer Edwin Beard Budding of the rotary lawn mower, an extrapolation of machinery commonly used to cut velvet pile.

== In popular culture ==
In the film Monty Python and the Holy Grail, the Knights Who Say "Ni!" demand the gift of a shrubbery in order to allow passage through their forest.
