= Mirables =

Coordinates: 50.58164°N 1.26812°W

Mirables ("fine prospect") is an English country house on the Isle of Wight in South East England. It was built by George Arnold of Ashby Lodge, Northamptonshire.

== Early history ==
The spot was originally chosen as a residence by George Arnold of Ashby Lodge, Northamptonshire, who added to the original cottage—one of the farmhouses of the area. The house was built in the cottage style and was enlarged at different periods. This has given it an irregular but not unpleasing appearance. It has one apartment which is adorned with pictures.

== Grounds ==
The lawn declines to the shore, where there are boat houses. This lawn is surrounded by shrubbery, intersected by serpentine walks, and a small flower garden. Above Mirables the clift attains its greatest height, and displays all the varied strata in vertical succession, from the gault in the bank by the roadside, to the chalk in the down above, which here rises to a peak known as the High Hat.
