= Max Laeuger =

German architect

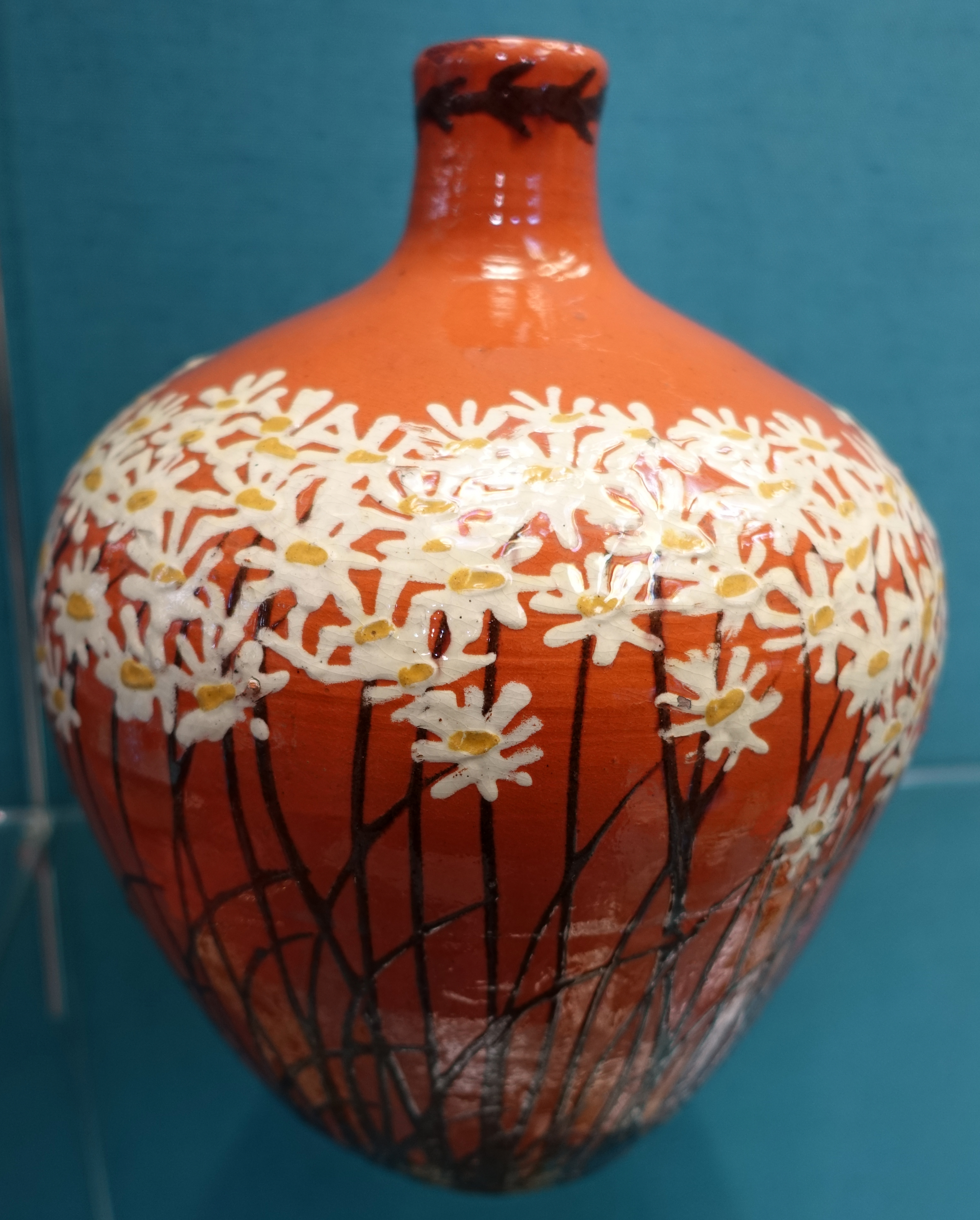
Vase by Max Laeuger, c. 1898, barbotine on earthenware

Max Laeuger (30 September 1864 – 12 December 1952) was a German architect, artist, and ceramicist. He was born and died in Lörrach, Baden-Württemberg.

Working initially in an Art Nouveau style, he was perhaps the most important figure in the relatively small German contribution to the art pottery movement, though he was a designer and decorator rather than a hands-on potter. As an architect he specialized in comfortable private houses, parks and public gardens, mostly in Germany. He was one of the founders of the Deutscher Werkbund in 1907.

== Life ==
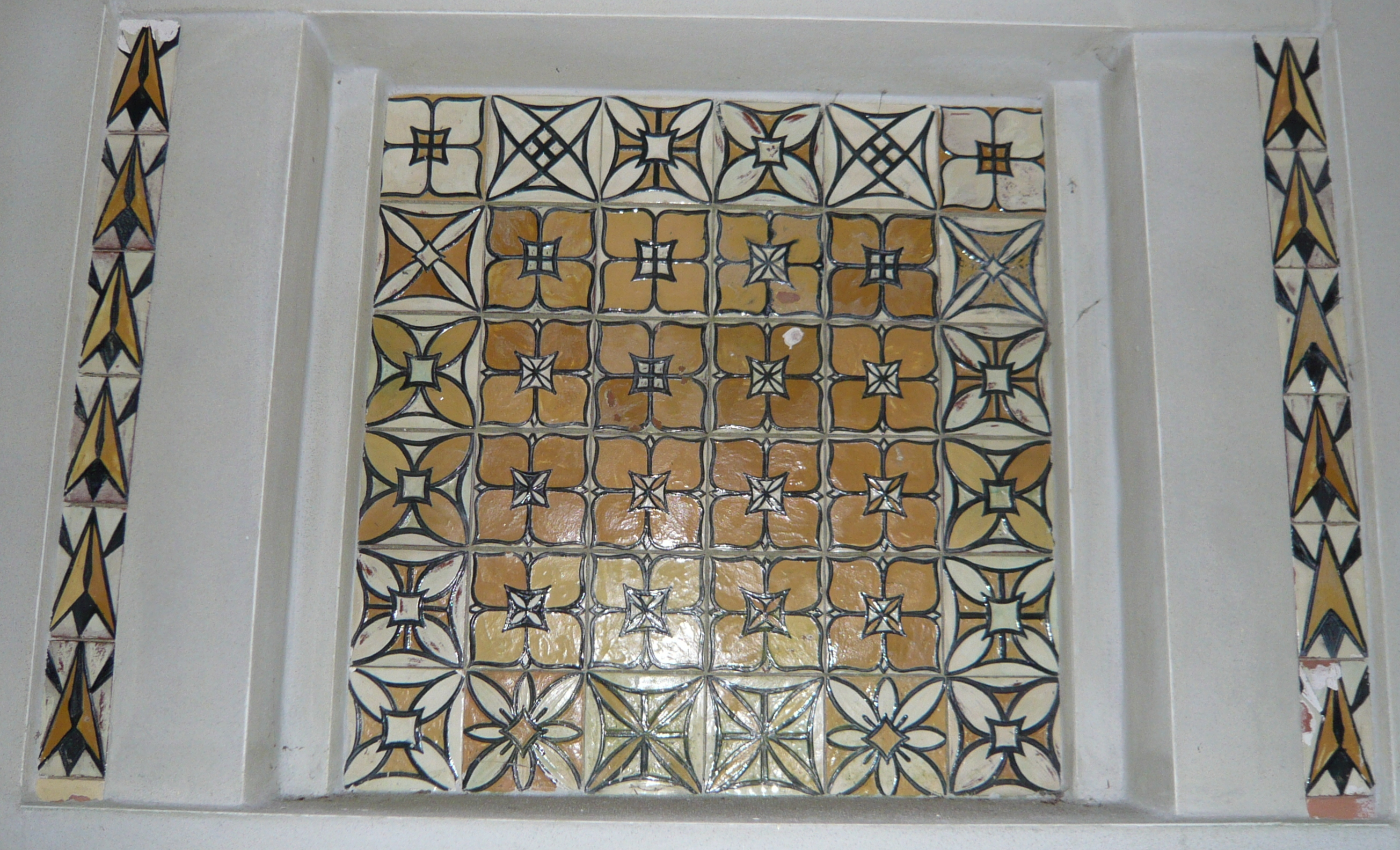
Tiles salvaged from his Het Kareol villa in Aerdenhout, Netherlands, 1911

From 1881 to 1884 he studied painting and interior design at the school of decorative arts in Karlsruhe, and was later professor of interior and garden design at the university there (now the Karlsruhe Institute of Technology) from 1894 until 1933. In German sources he is often given his professorial title, in the German way. He travelled to Italy in 1891, and then lived in Paris, where he studied painting at the private Académie Julian in 1891–92. Other major travels were to Rome and North Africa in 1905, and Spain, studying Islamic ceramics there, in 1912.

Between 1937 and 1939 he published a history of art in three volumes.

== Pottery ==
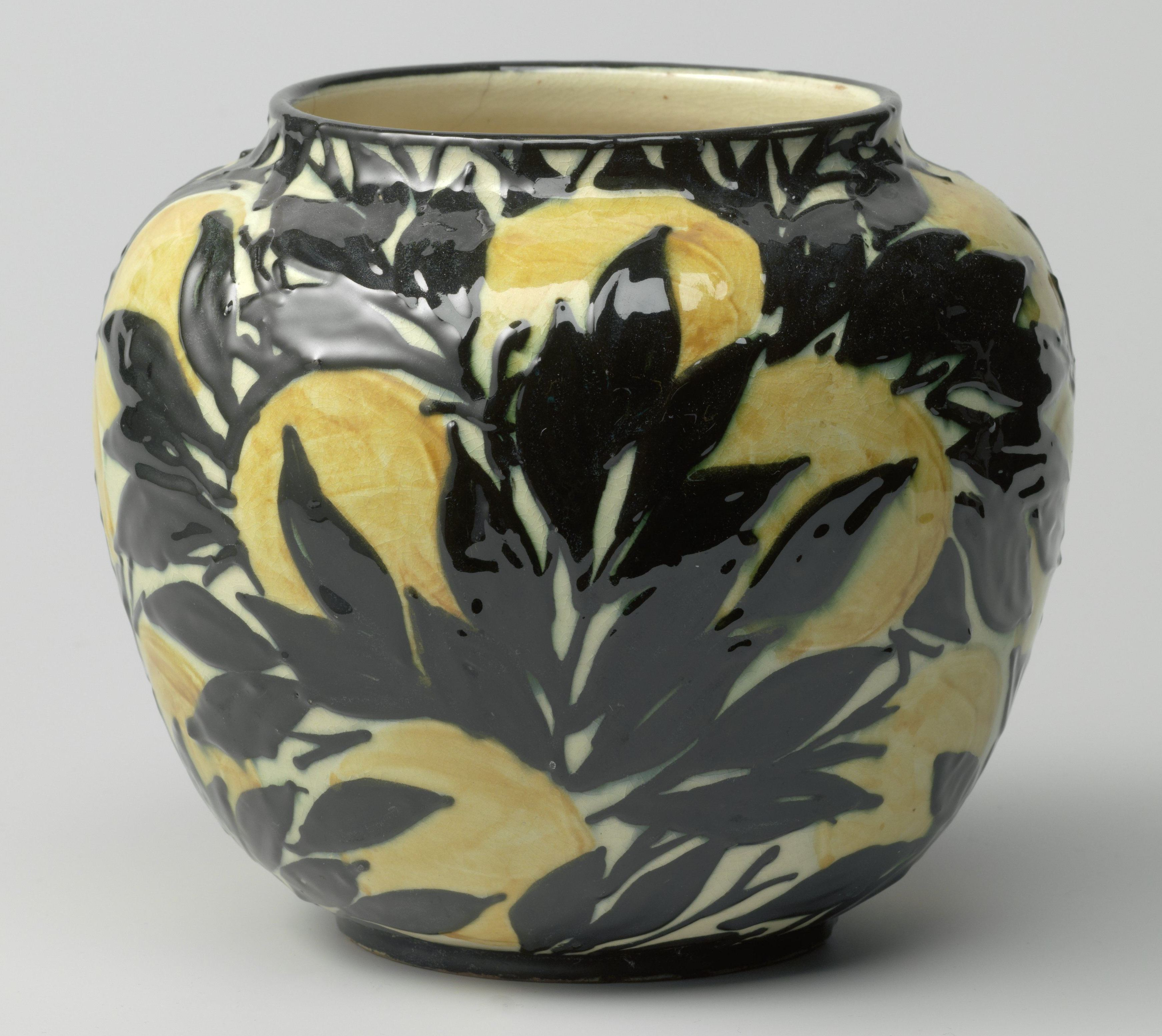
Vase, Karlsruhe, 1921–25

Olympic medal record

Art competitions
Bronze medal – third place	1928 Amsterdam	Town planning

He first became interested in pottery in 1885, visiting the Mayer pottery in Karlsruhe, and another, Manufakture Tonwerke, in Kandern in the Black Forest. He began to have his designs produced in Kandern from 1897, when Art Nouveau was already the dominant style trend, and continued to use the pottery there until 1914. By 1898 his pieces were on sale at the Paris shop of Siegfried Bing, "Maison de l'Art Nouveau" ("House of New Art"), which had given the movement its name. Later his works were sold at the German critic Julius Meier-Graefe's competitive gallery in Paris, La Maison Moderne (1897–1903).

His works won gold medals at both the Paris Exposition Universelle (1900) and the St. Louis World's Fair in 1904. These and smaller events were important for raising the profile of potters, especially those working in backwoods locations. Much later, in 1928 he won a bronze medal in the art competitions of the Amsterdam Olympic Games for his Hamburg Stadtpark.

In 1916 he took over the former premises of the Staatliche Majolika Manufaktur Karlsruhe to create his own pottery atelier; this was destroyed by Allied bombing in 1944, after which (at the age of 80) he returned to Lörrach for his remaining years.

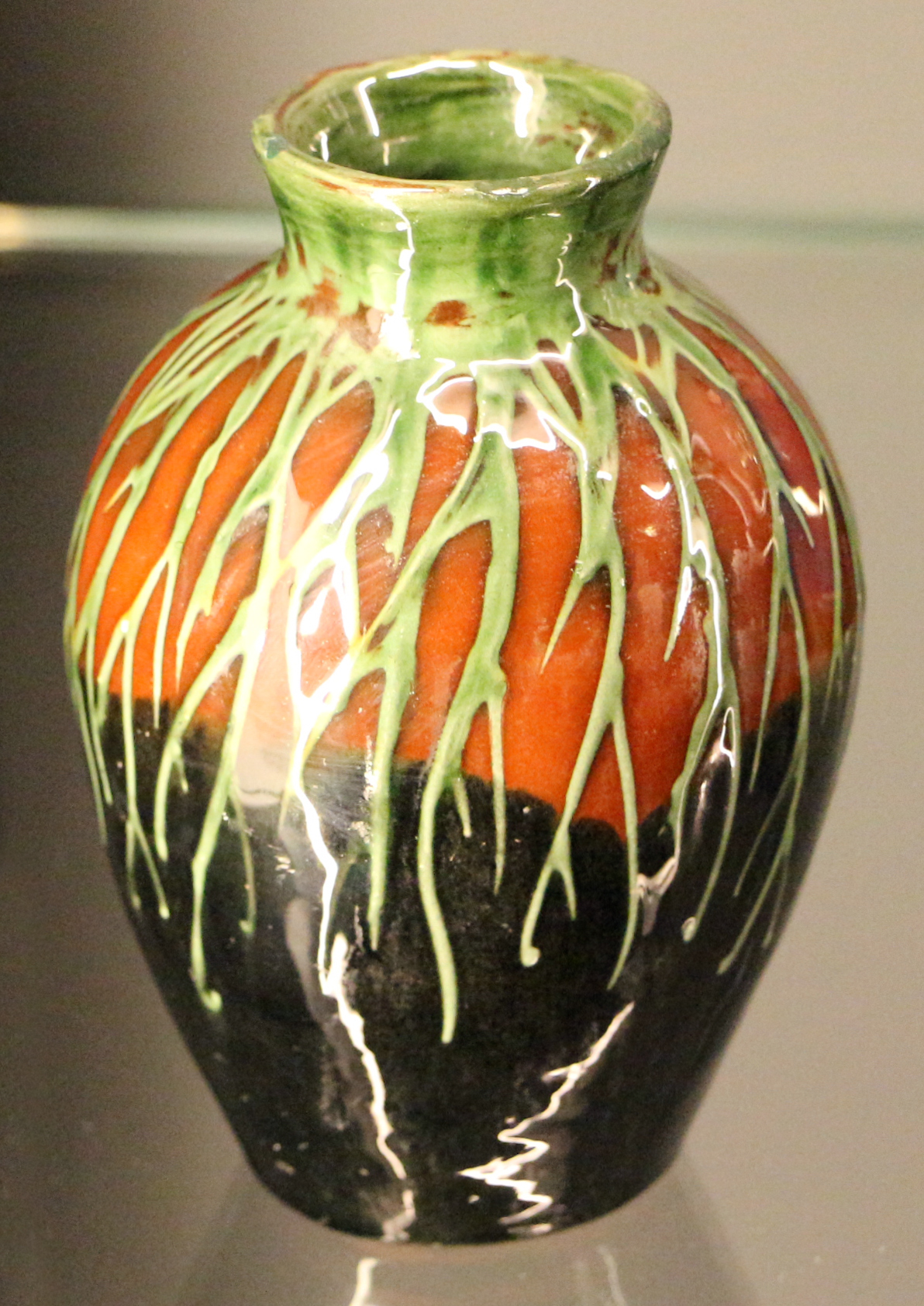
Vase, Kandern, 1898-1900

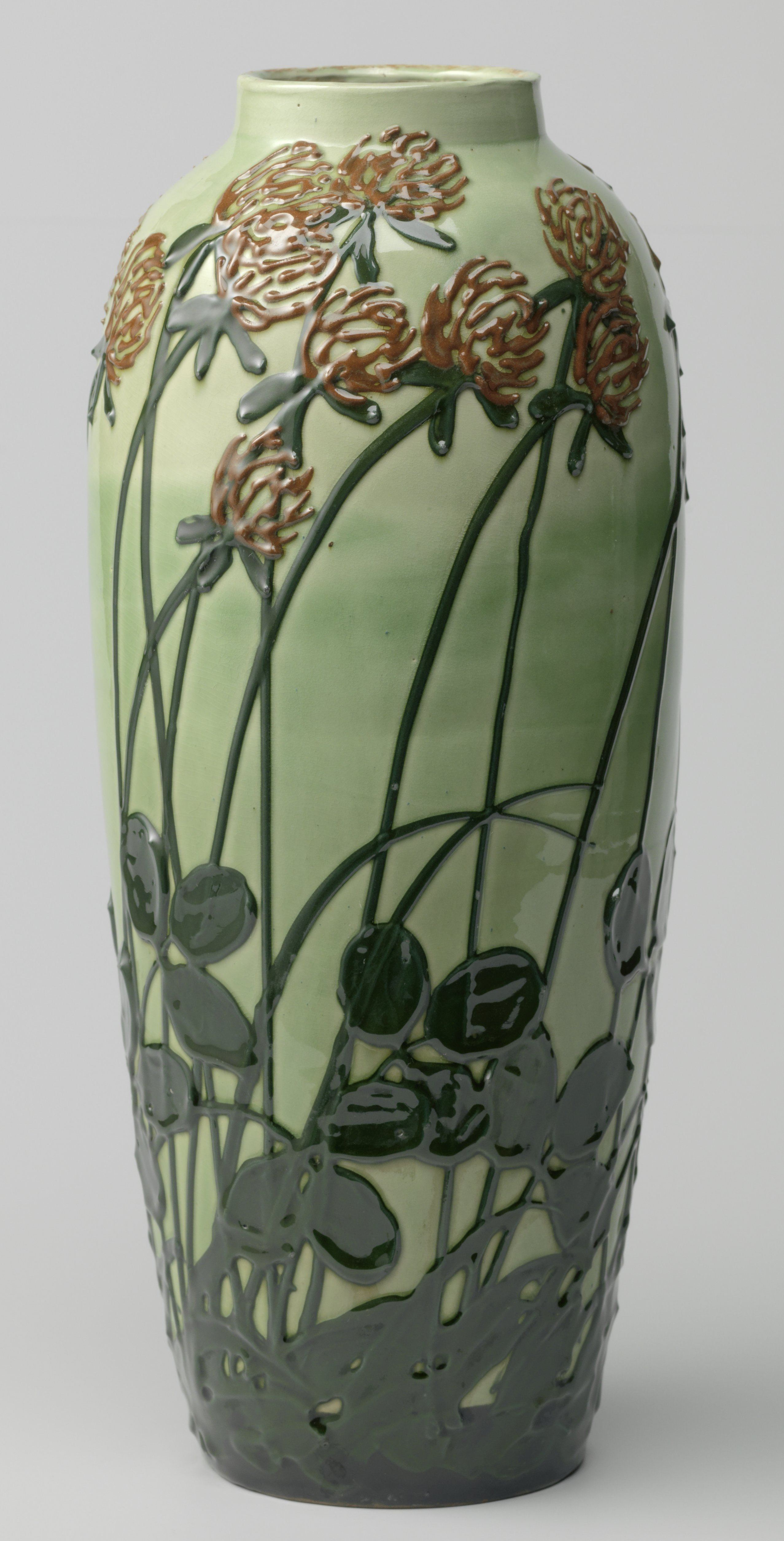
Vase, Kandern, c. 1900

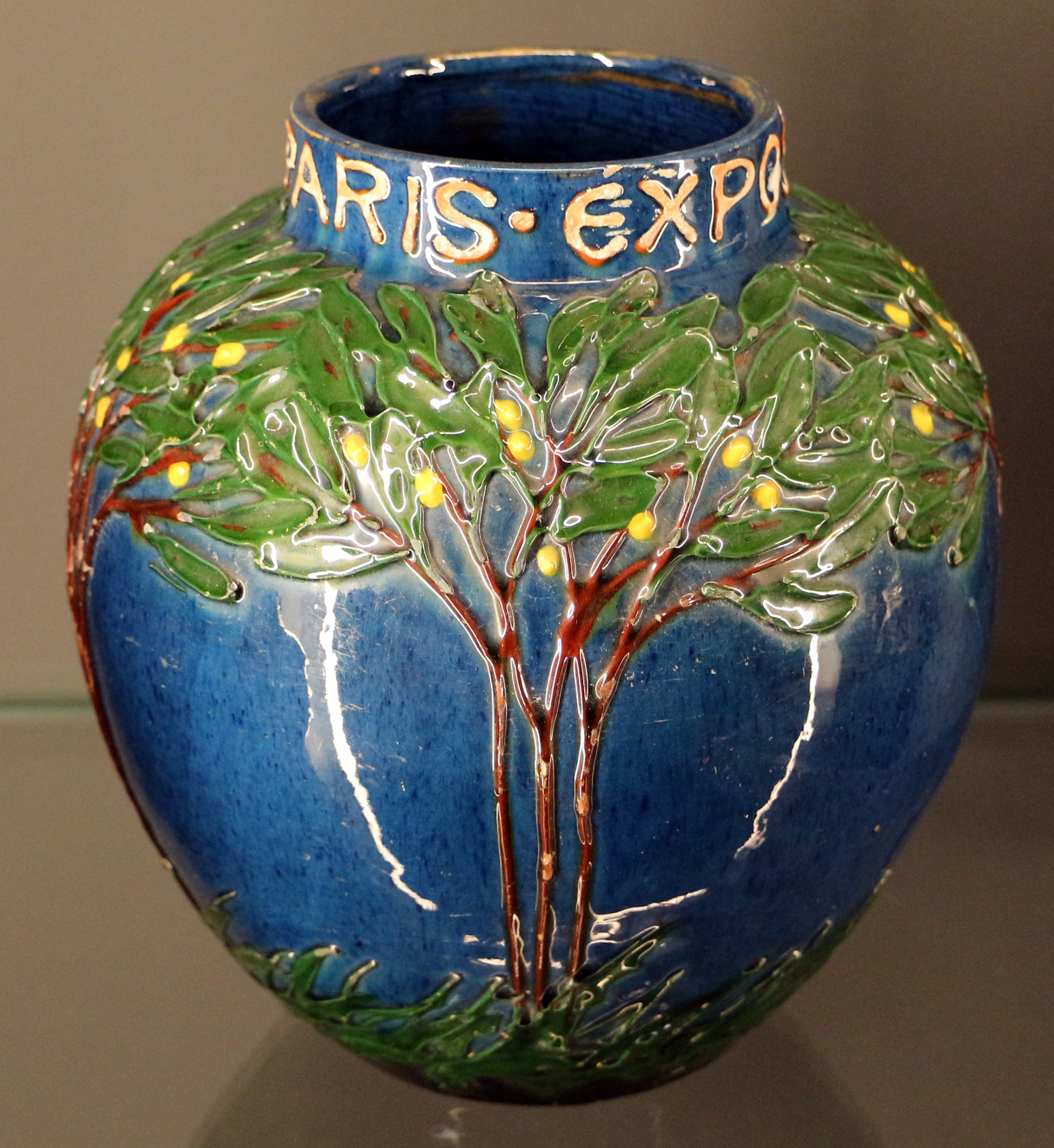
Vase, Kandern, 1900, for the Paris Exposition Universelle (1900)

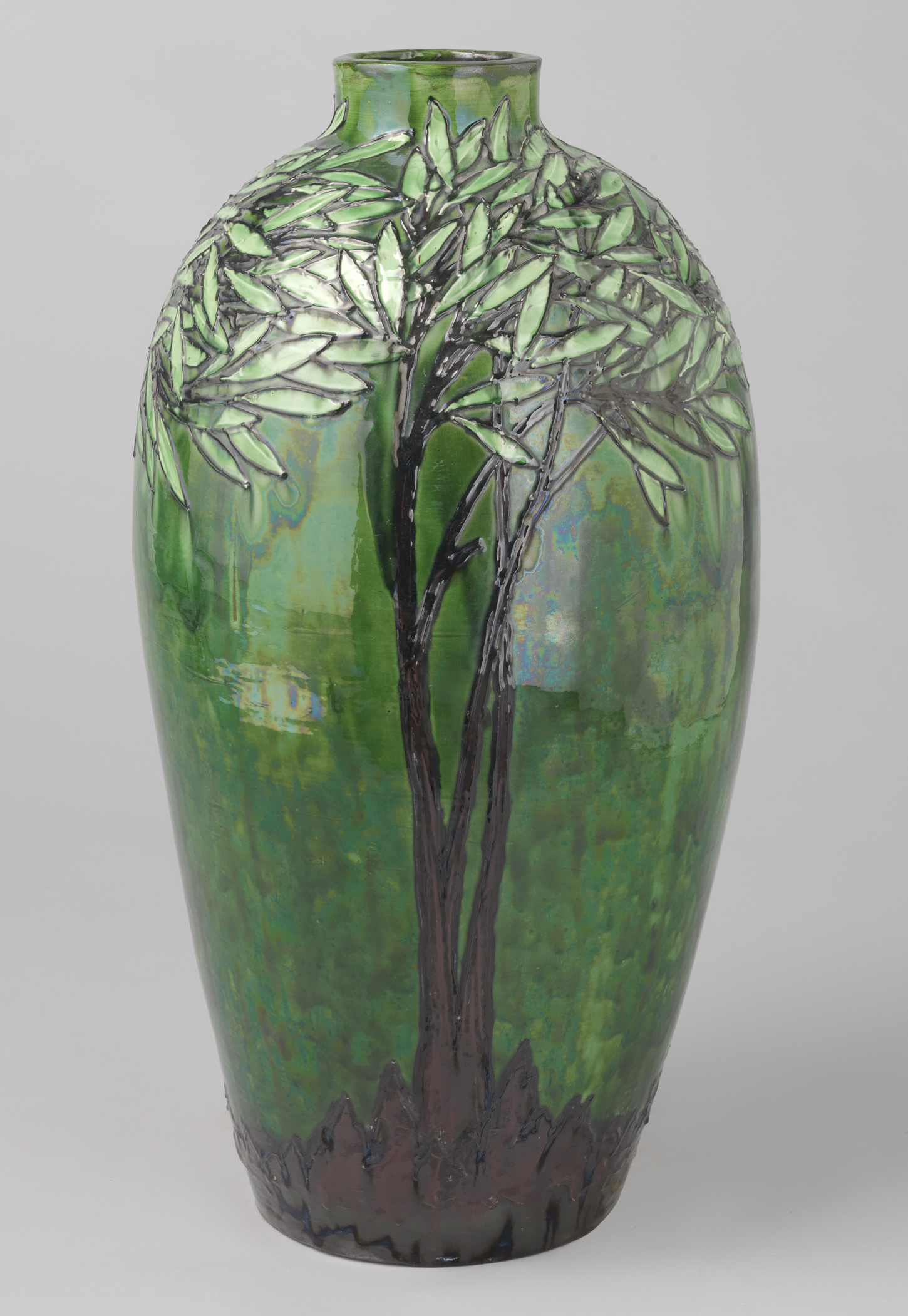
Vase, Kandern, 1910

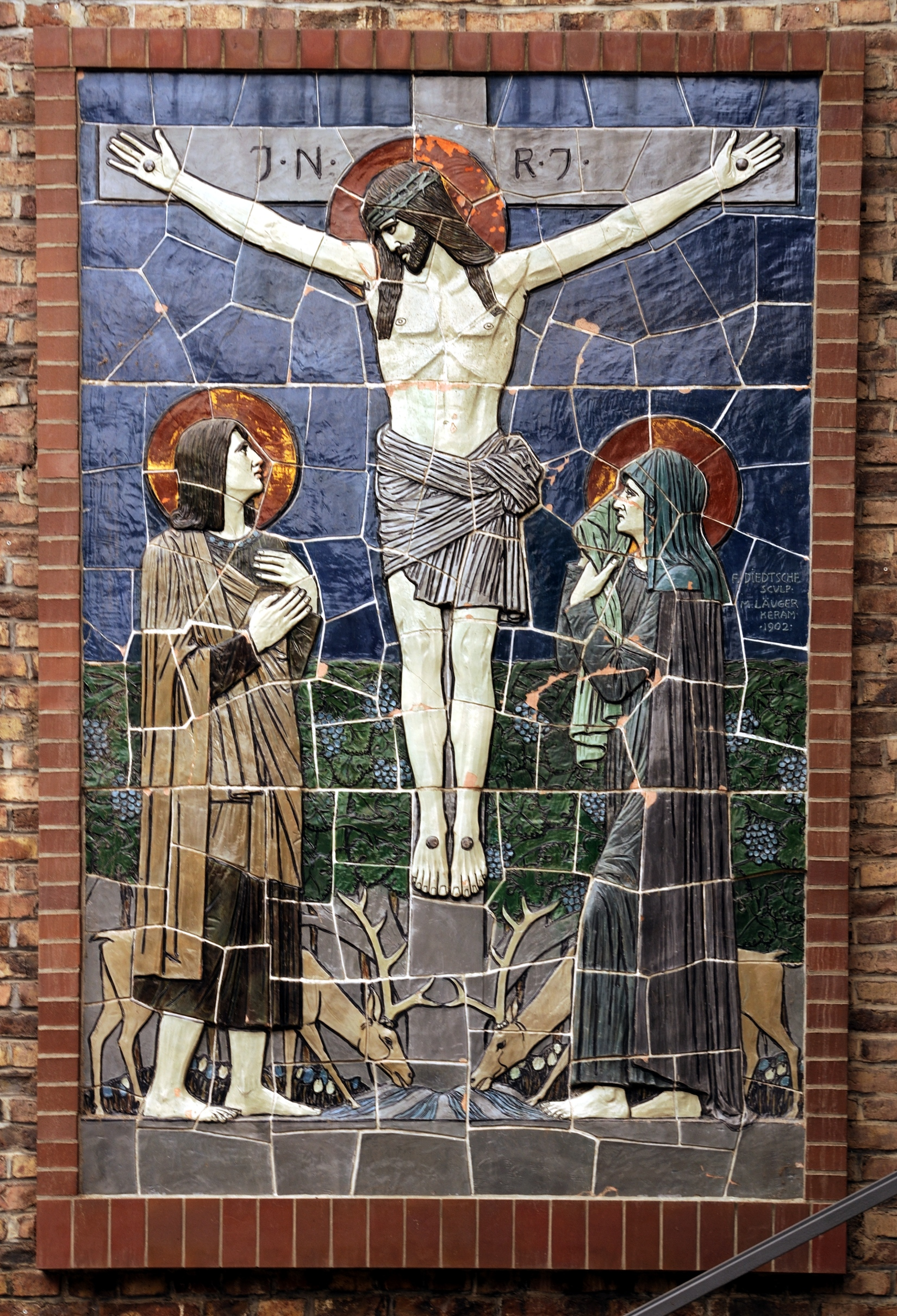
Ceramic Crucifixion relief for a church in Lörrach

== Architecture and other work ==
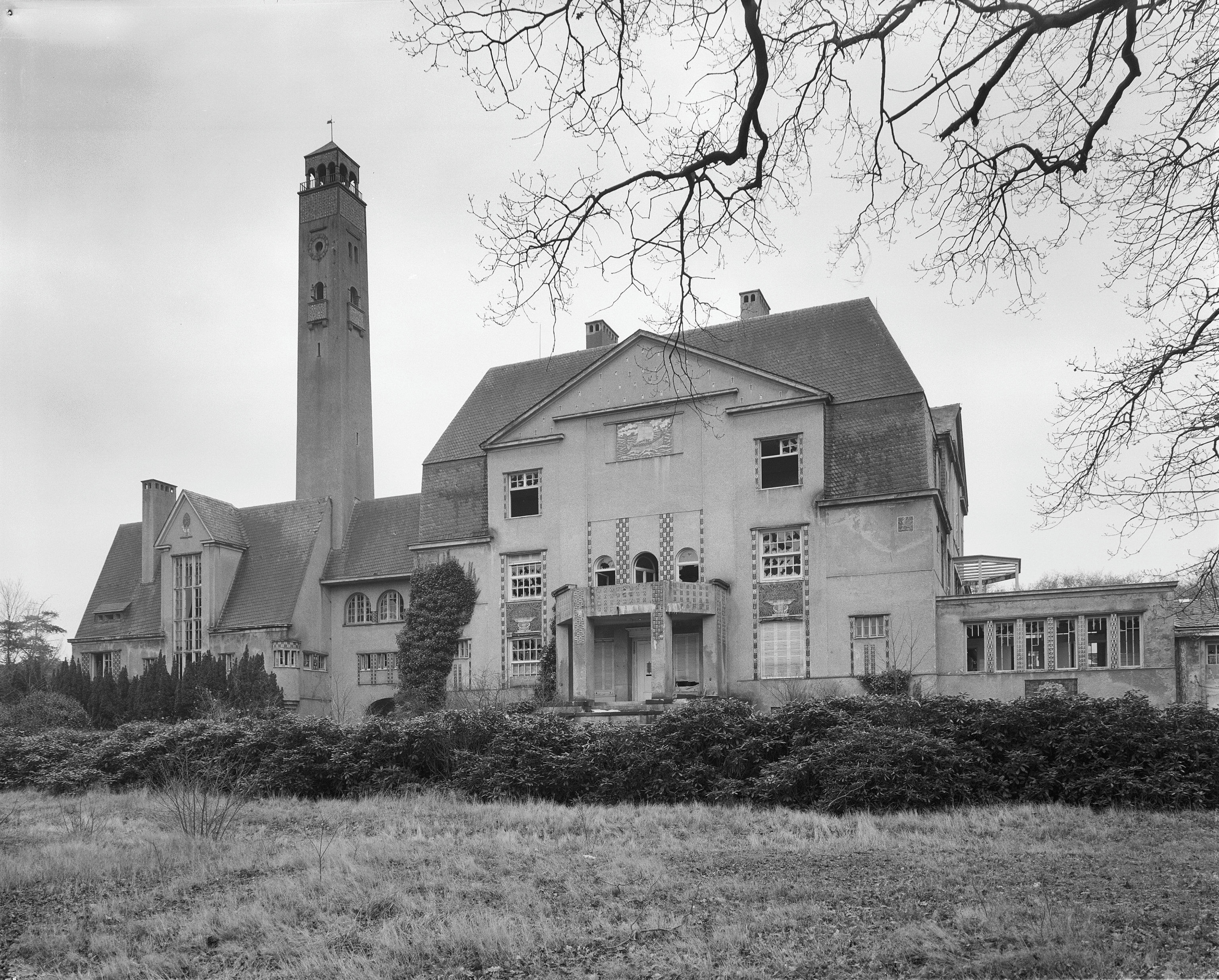
Het Kareol, 1907–11, photo the year before it was demolished in 1979

He designed several large garden and park projects. Perhaps his major commission was for the huge villa Het Kareol, allegedly the largest private house built in the Netherlands in the 20th century, demolished in 1979, though some fragments survive. He started work there in 1907, and the project was completed in 1911. As well as the house, he designed the tiling which was a prominent feature of both the interior and exterior, and also the large gardens, bronze light fixtures and composed externsive drawings of the interior. The Villa Küchlin in Horben in the Black Forest was another country house, still rather large, and he designed a number of other houses for the wealthy.

The Hamburg Stadtpark was a highly prestigious commission, designed to give Hamburg a large central park along the lines of Munich's Englischer Garten, Berlin's Tiergarten, London's Hyde Park and Regent's Park, or New York's Central Park. A contest was held in 1908 for designs, which became bedevilled by "conflicts and secret maneuvers", exposing differing views on park design, as well as personal rivalries. No first prize was given, but Laeuger's design was one of three second prizes. After a period of tussling between several figures, including some very underhand dealing by the young Leberecht Migge, a compromise scheme was adopted, which pleased nobody. Laeuger rather bitterly saw it as his scheme stripped of some of its more architectural and expensive elements.

Between 1909 and 1912 he worked on the Gönneranlage estate in Baden-Baden, whose gardens, filled with sculpture and roses, are now a public park. From 1922 to 1925 he worked on the existing Wasserkunstanlage Paradies ("Paradise water-garden"), also in Baden-Baden, notably adding a sloping cascade of water in a sinuous Art Nouveau style. The Max-Laeuger Platz by the entrance is named in his honour.

In 1933 he designed a public memorial in Mannheim for Carl Benz (1844–1929), founder of Mercedes-Benz. Benz was an alumnus of the Karlsruhe Institute of Technology where Laeuger was a professor, and Laeuger also designed the architectural setting for a bust there of the former professor Heinrich Hertz, after whom the electrical unit is named. He designed stained-glass windows for St. Paul's Church, Basel.

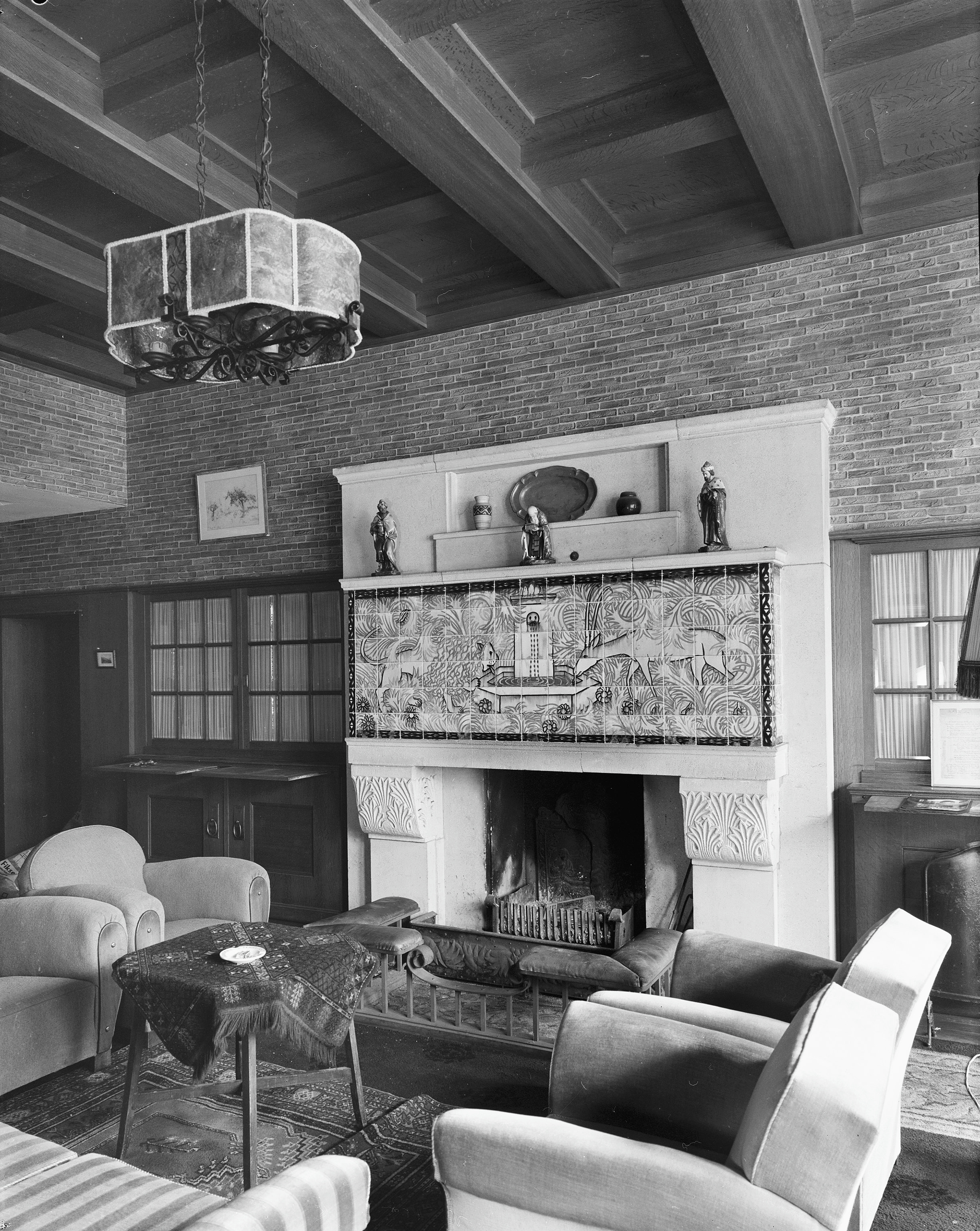
Interior at Het Kareol, with tile panel

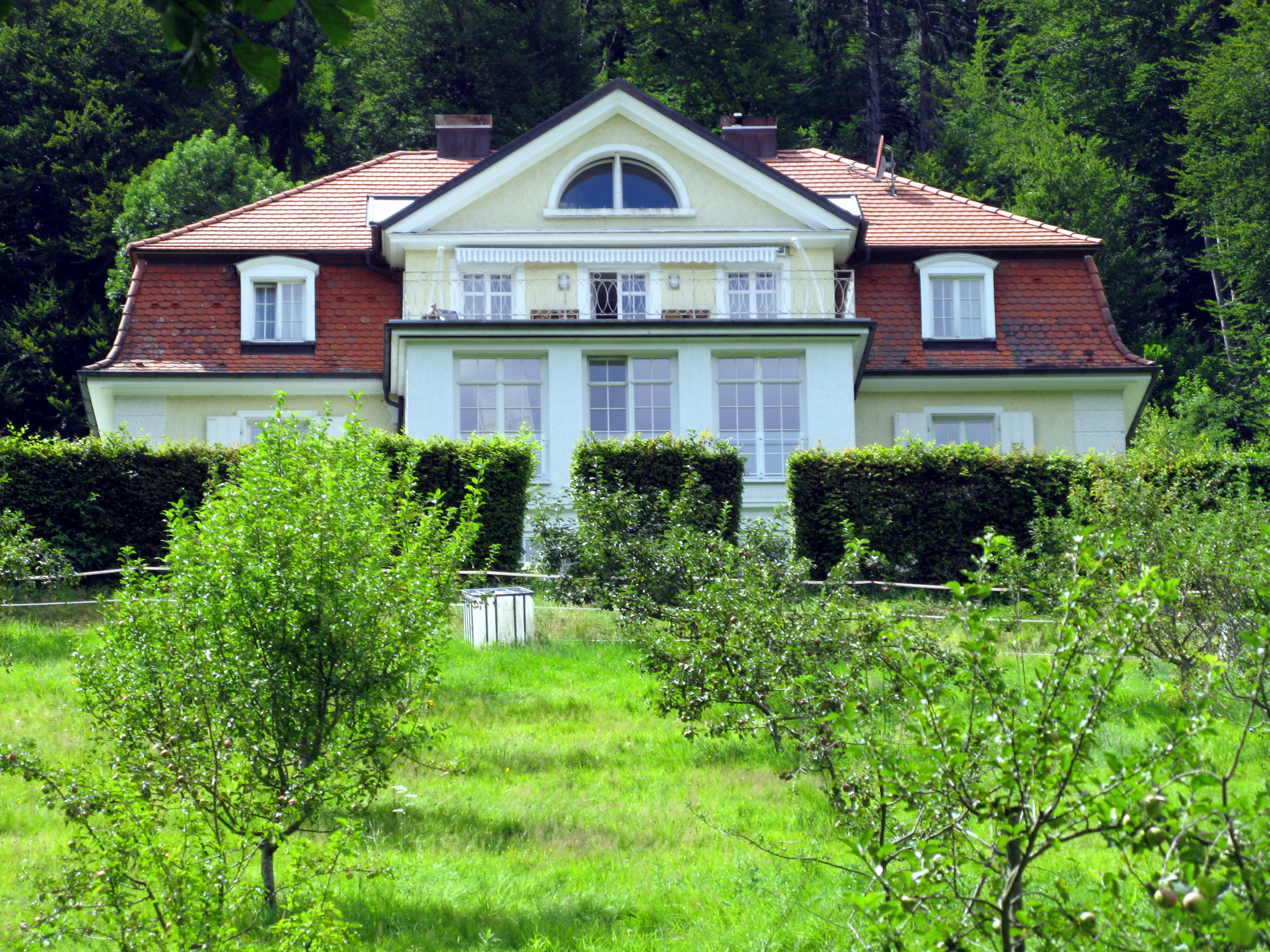
Villa Küchlin, Horben

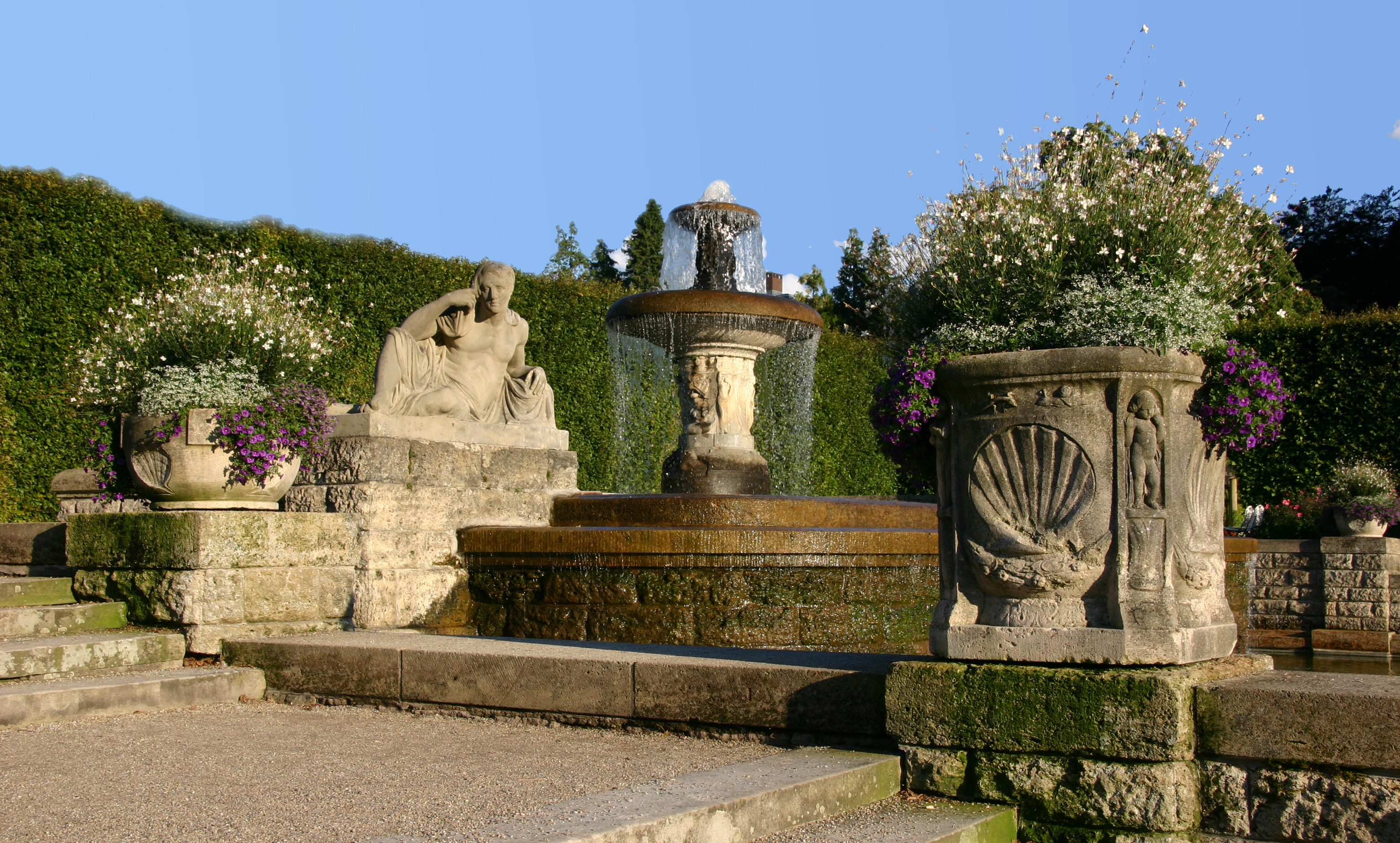
Gönneranlage gardens

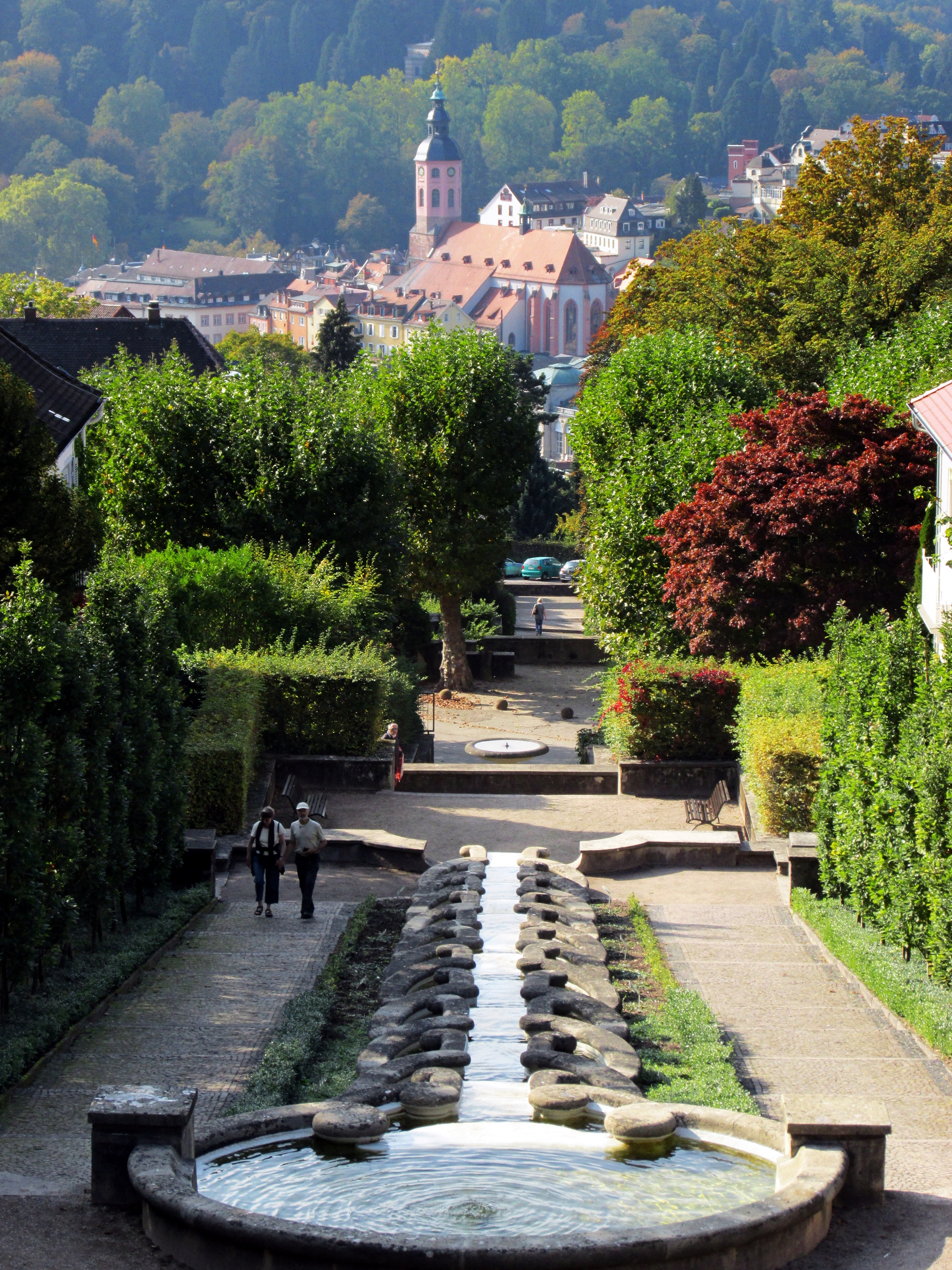
The cascade at Wasserkunstanlage Paradies

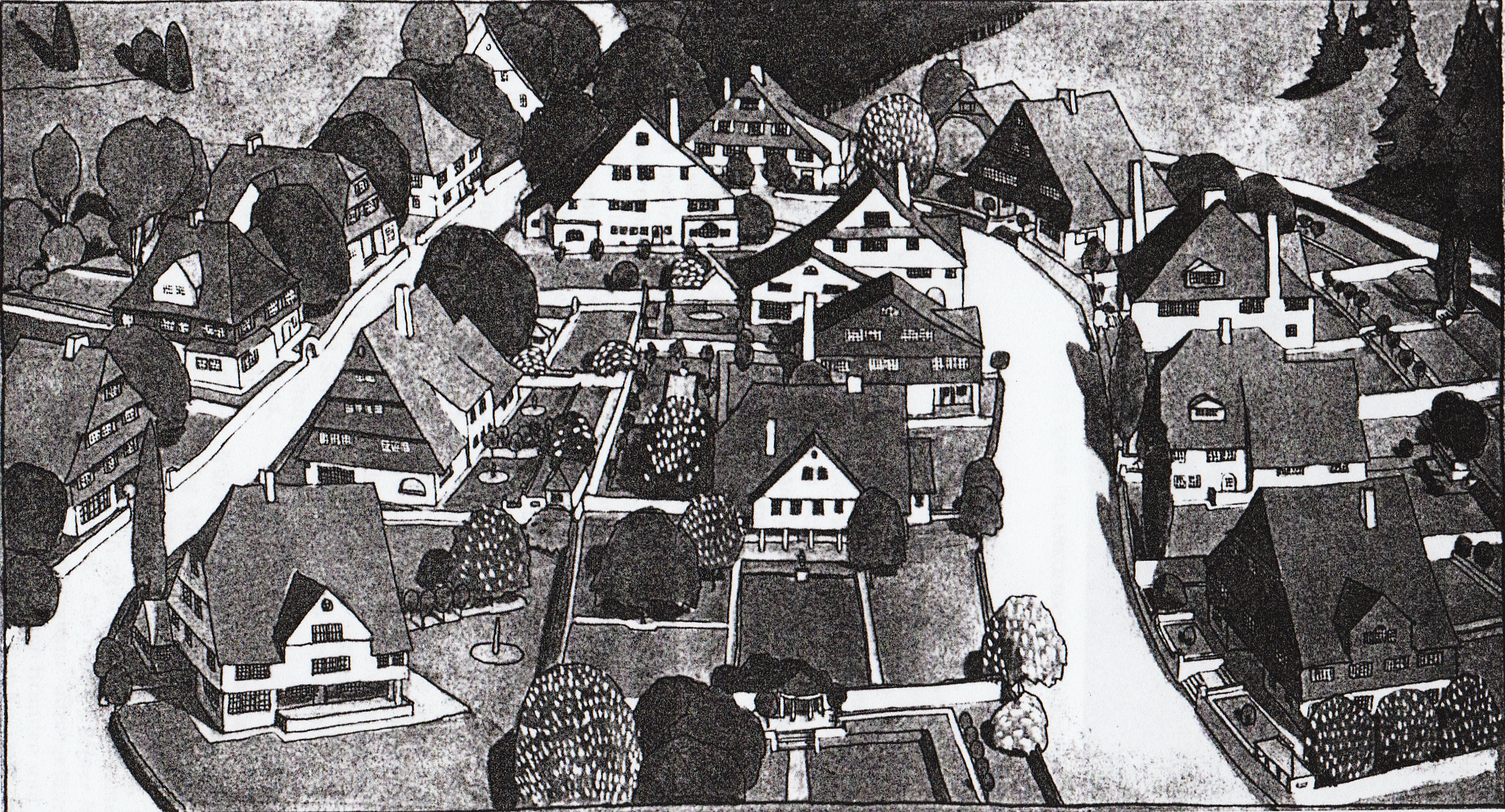
Drawing for a residential development in Horben, 1907
