= Flower garden =

Garden where flowers are grown and displayed

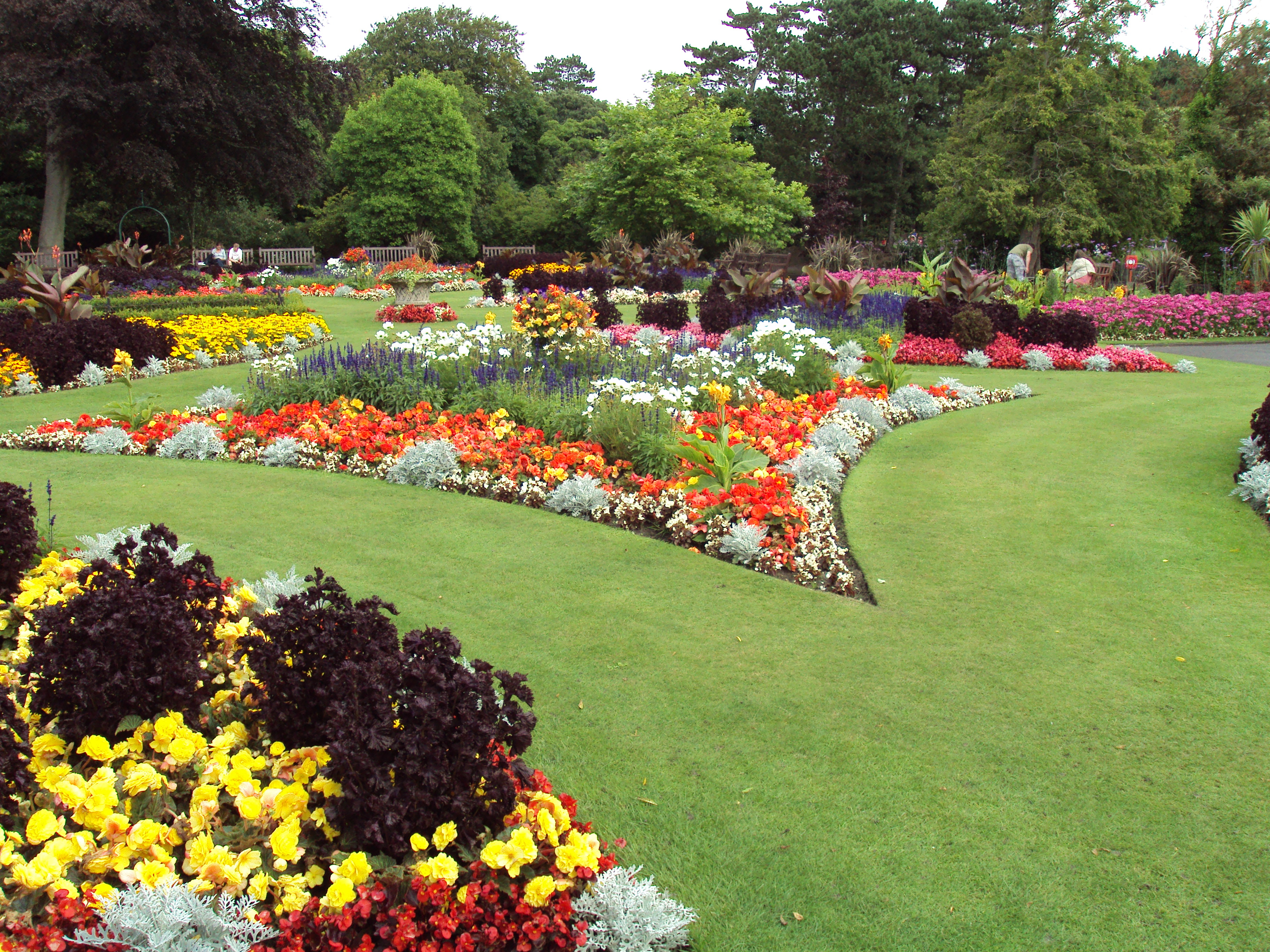
Flower garden at the Botanic Gardens, Churchtown, Southport, Merseyside, England

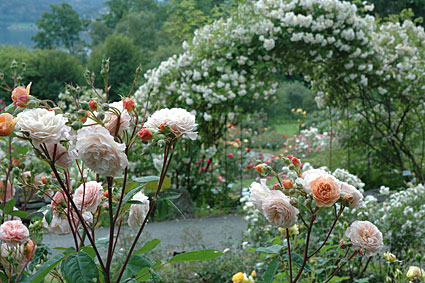
Flower garden in Norway, Arboretum in Bergen

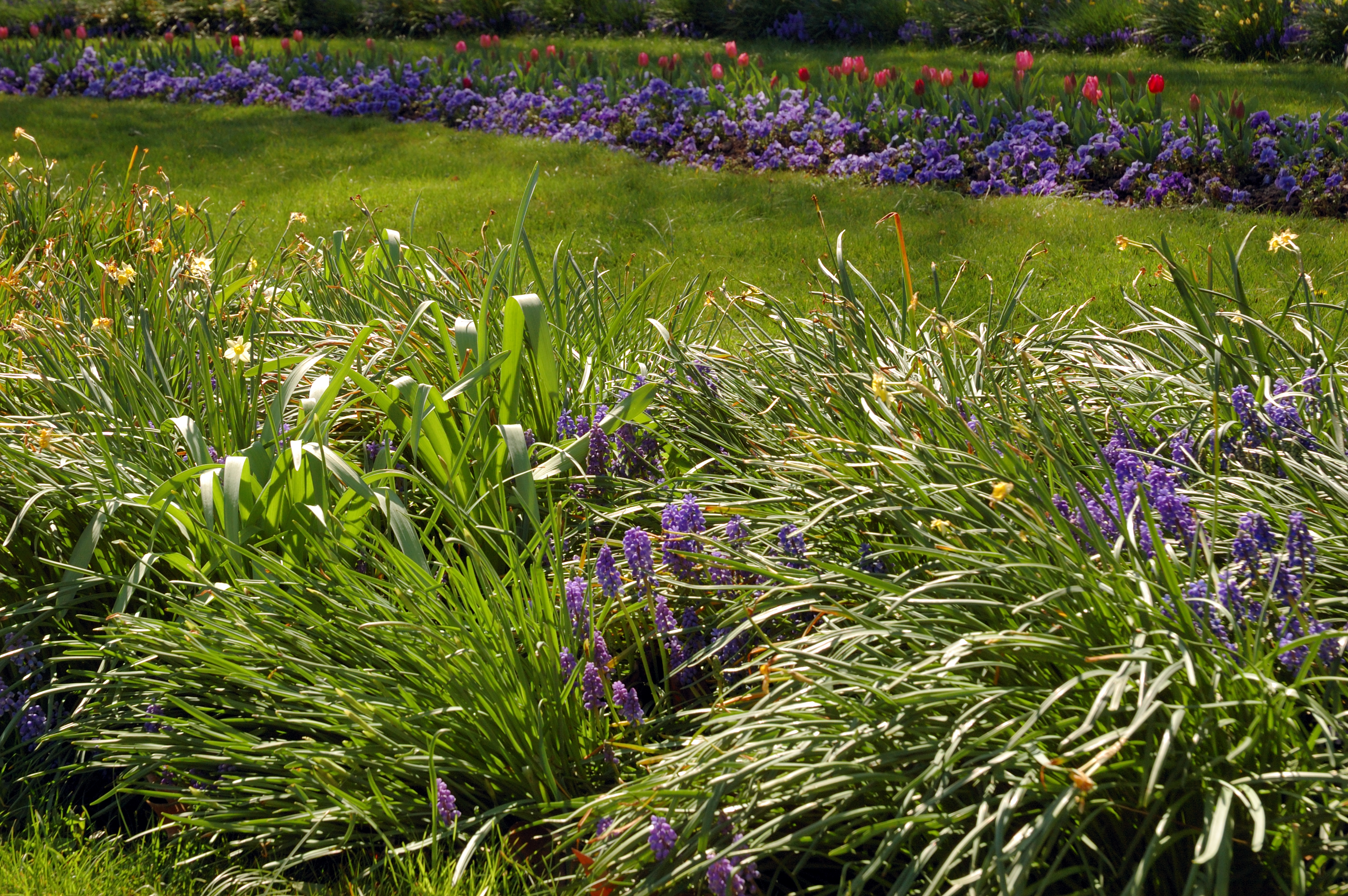
Flower gardens combine plants of different heights, colors, textures, and fragrances to create interest and delight the senses.

A flower garden or floral garden is any garden or part of a garden where plants that flower are grown and displayed. This normally refers mostly to herbaceous plants, rather than flowering woody plants, which dominate in the shrubbery and woodland garden, although both these types may be part of the planting in any area of the garden.

Most herbaceous flowering plants, especially annuals, benefit from growing in a flowerbed, with soil that is regularly dug over and supplemented with organic matter and fertilizer. Another benefit for flowering plants is pollinators. Flower gardens attract varying amounts of pollinators based on variables such as floral richness and display size.

Because flowers bloom at varying times of the year, and some plants are annuals, dying each winter, the design of flower gardens usually needs to take into consideration maintaining a sequence of bloom and consistent color combinations through varying seasons. Besides organizing the flowers in bedding-out schemes limited to annual and perennial flower beds, careful design also takes the labour time, and the color pattern of the flowers into account.

Flower color is another important feature of both the herbaceous border and the mixed border that includes shrubs as well as herbaceous plants. Flower gardens are sometimes tied in function to other kinds of gardens, like knot gardens or herb gardens, many herbs also having decorative function, and some decorative flowers being edible.

== History ==
Many, if not most, plants considered decorative flowers originated as weeds, which if attractive enough would sometimes be tolerated by farmers because of their appeal. This led to an artificial selection process, producing ever-prettier (to humans) flowers. This is thought to have occurred for the entire history of agriculture, perhaps even slightly earlier, when people tended to favor naturally occurring food-gathering spots. This may also explain why many flowers function as companion plants to more useful agricultural plants; they had evolved that symbiotic relationship with the food plants before either was domesticated, and therefore was found in the same area, convenient to be selected as an attractive plant. Sunflower

Once domesticated, though, most flowers were grown either separately or as part of gardens having some other primary function. In the West, the idea of parts of gardens dedicated to flowers perhaps did not become common until the 16th century.

Flower gardens are a key factor in modern landscape design and even architecture. This is especially true for large businesses, some of which pay to have large flower gardens torn out and replaced entirely each season, in order to keep the color patterns consistent.

The labour time can be decreased by using techniques such as mulching. In flower meadows, grass growth can be moderated by planting parasitic plants such as Rhinanthus.

== Pollinators ==
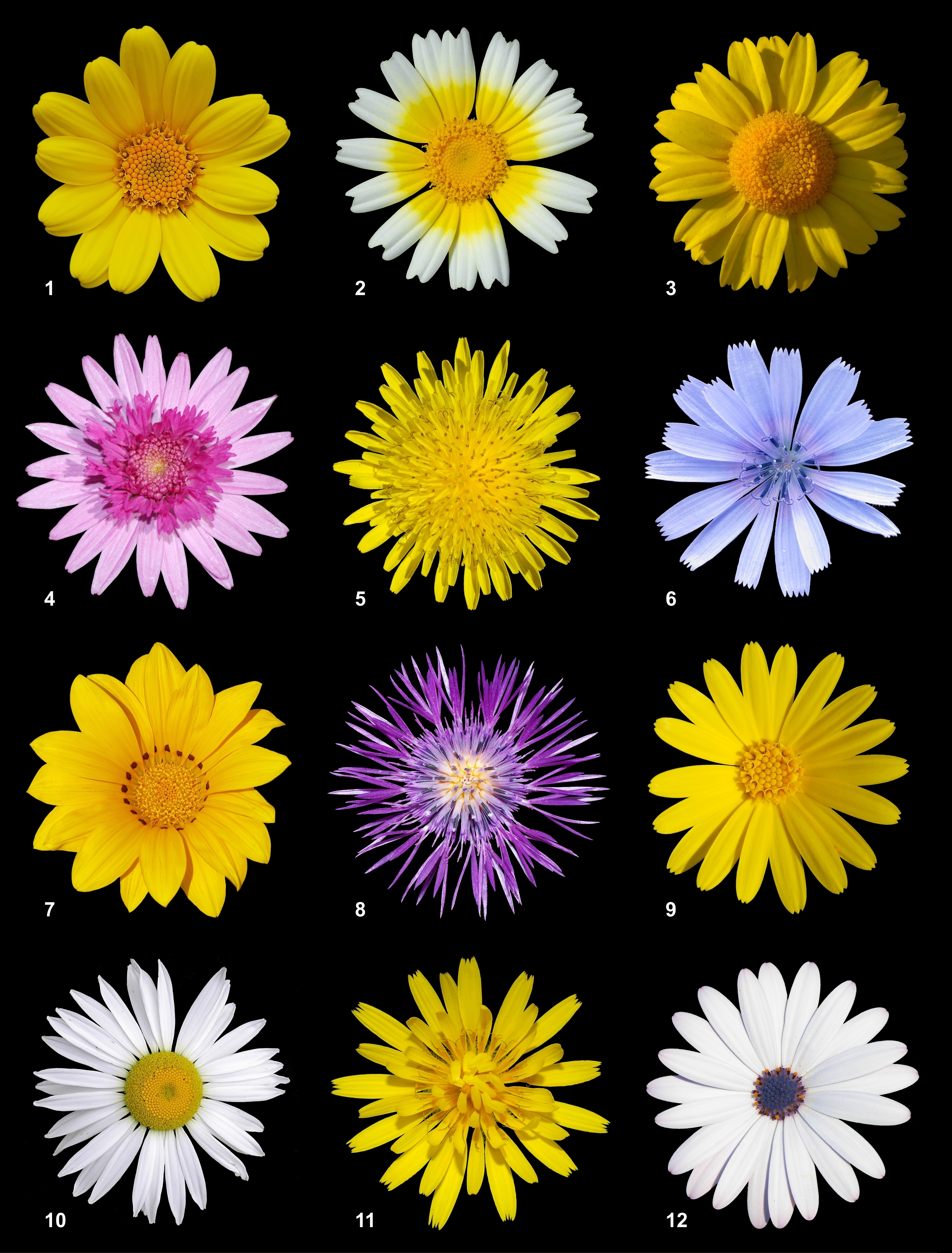
Flowers in the Asteracea family

When considering the attractiveness of a flower garden to pollinators, the richness of the garden can be seen to increase pollinator activity. The more diverse the flowers and the benefits each offer, the more likely it becomes for pollinators to visit the flower garden. Additionally, larger floral displays experience more pollinator activity.

Common pollinators include honeybees, bumblebees, and hover flies.

When Asteraceaes, Lamiaceaes, and Fabaceaes are grown together bee attractiveness increases compared to when these families are grown separately, or by themselves. More specifically, the thistle, Cirsium vulgare, is an effective plant species for attracting pollinators. In general, native flowers attract more pollinators than non-native species.

Herbicide can decrease the amount of pollinators that visit a flower garden.

== Fertilizers ==
When used alone, fertilizer can increase the height of flowering plants. Fertilizer also enhances the timeliness for a species to flower. In other words, flowering species treated with fertilizer flower earlier compared to untreated flowers.

Herbicide does not yield these same results. Instead, herbicide results in negative impacts on flowering height. A combination of herbicide and fertilizer treatments minimally impact the flower.

For roses specifically, seaweed extract and potassium silicate are found to be efficient fertilizers to prevent rotting and wilting. Vitavax 200 is also considered an effective fertilizer for roses.

== Cutting garden ==
A functional garden used to grow flowers for indoor use rather than outdoor display is known as a cutting garden. Flowers that once cut, regrow are used for planting in cutting gardens.

The cutting garden is typically placed in a fertile and sunlight position out of public view and is not artistically arranged, as it contains flowers for cutting. Very often flowers for cutting are grown in greenhouses, to protect them from severe weather, and control their time of flowering. The cutting garden may also include a herb garden and ornamental vegetables as well.

Cutting gardens include flowers that can be used as focal points, fillers, and foliage for bouquets. For focal points, flowers such as dahlias, tulips, and hydrangeas have been grown in cutting gardens. Fillers can include Sweet William, nigella, and orlaya. As for foliage, eucalyptus, honeywort, and Bells of Ireland are a few options.

== Modern alternatives ==
A simpler alternative to the designed flower garden is the "wildflower" seed mix, with assortments of seeds which will create a bed that contains flowers of various blooming seasons, so that some portion of them should always be in bloom. The best mixtures even include combinations of perennial and biennials, which may not bloom until the following year, and also annuals that are "self-seeding", so they will return, creating a permanent flowerbed.

Another, even more recent trend is the "flower garden in a box", where the entire design of a flower garden is pre-packaged, with separate packets of each kind of flower, and a careful layout to be followed to create the proposed pattern of color in the garden-to-be.

== See also ==
- Bedding (horticulture)
- Herbaceous border
- List of garden types
- Raised-bed gardening
