= Kareol =

Coordinates: 52°21′27″N 4°35′33″E

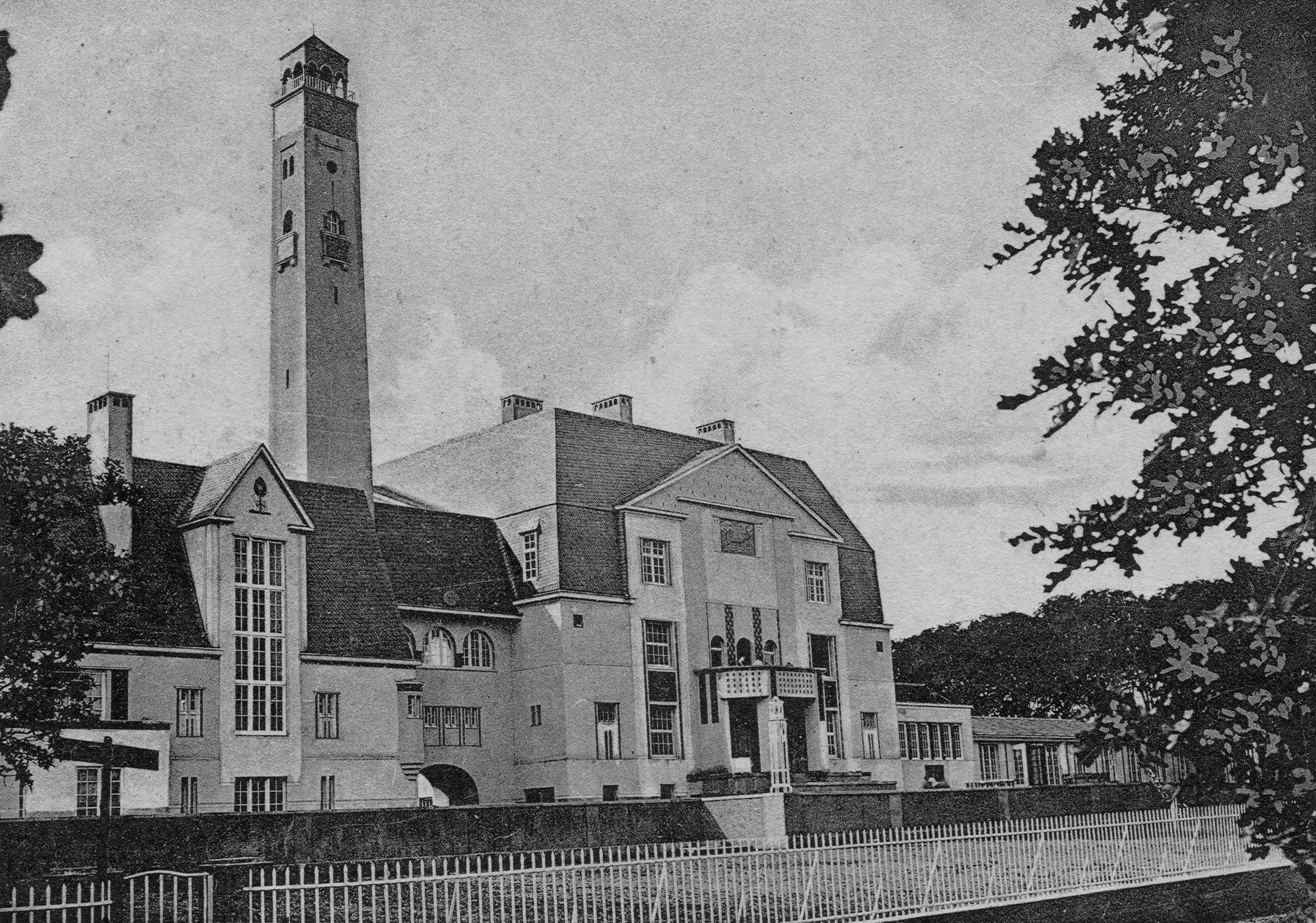
- Kareol, about 1915
- Type: castle
- Location: Aerdenhout, The Netherlands
- Built: 1908-1911
- Built by: Julius Carl Bunge
- Demolished: 1979

Kareol (1910-1979) was a huge Art Deco/Sezession style building on the Van Lennepweg in Aerdenhout, Netherlands. It was the largest house being built for a private owner in the Netherlands in the 20th century. It was demolished in 1979.

== History ==
Kareol had a high water tower that could be seen from the train and was built in 1908 by a German-born Amsterdammer, the banker and chairman of the Wagnervereniging, Julius Carl Bunge. It was situated in a park with a small forest. Kareol was built from 1907 until 1911. The architects S. Silow and A. Lundberg made the first sketches. Already in 1907 the German artist, designer and architect Max Laeuger took over the building site when the foundation walls were built. He not only developed an extensive decoration programme that included the interior, tiles, and light fixtures, but also designed the large garden. The whole building was constructed of reinforced concrete. The height of the water tower was 32 meters.

Bunge was a worshiper of Richard Wagner and there were many tiles in the house with pictures referring to the opera Tristan and Isolde. The whole building was lavishly decorated with tiles by Max Laeuger. The small temple at the end of one of the park lanes still has a tile design, the last remnant of a whole collection of them that had been used to decorate the house. Two of them have been reinstalled in the Bloemendaal city hall to commemorate the villa.

During the Second World War the house was used as a sanatorium for wounded soldiers. The Dutch Military Victims Association still has a magazine named The Kareoler. In the 1960s the building was uninhabited and occasionally used for filming locations.

In 1977 a preservation order was placed on the building but it was removed again in 1979. There were many local efforts to keep and restore the house, including a foundation established with the aim of preserving the house, but they were unsuccessful. Demolition of the building started in May 1979 and was completed in October.

Twenty years later an apartment building was built on the same spot. The park grounds have been preserved.

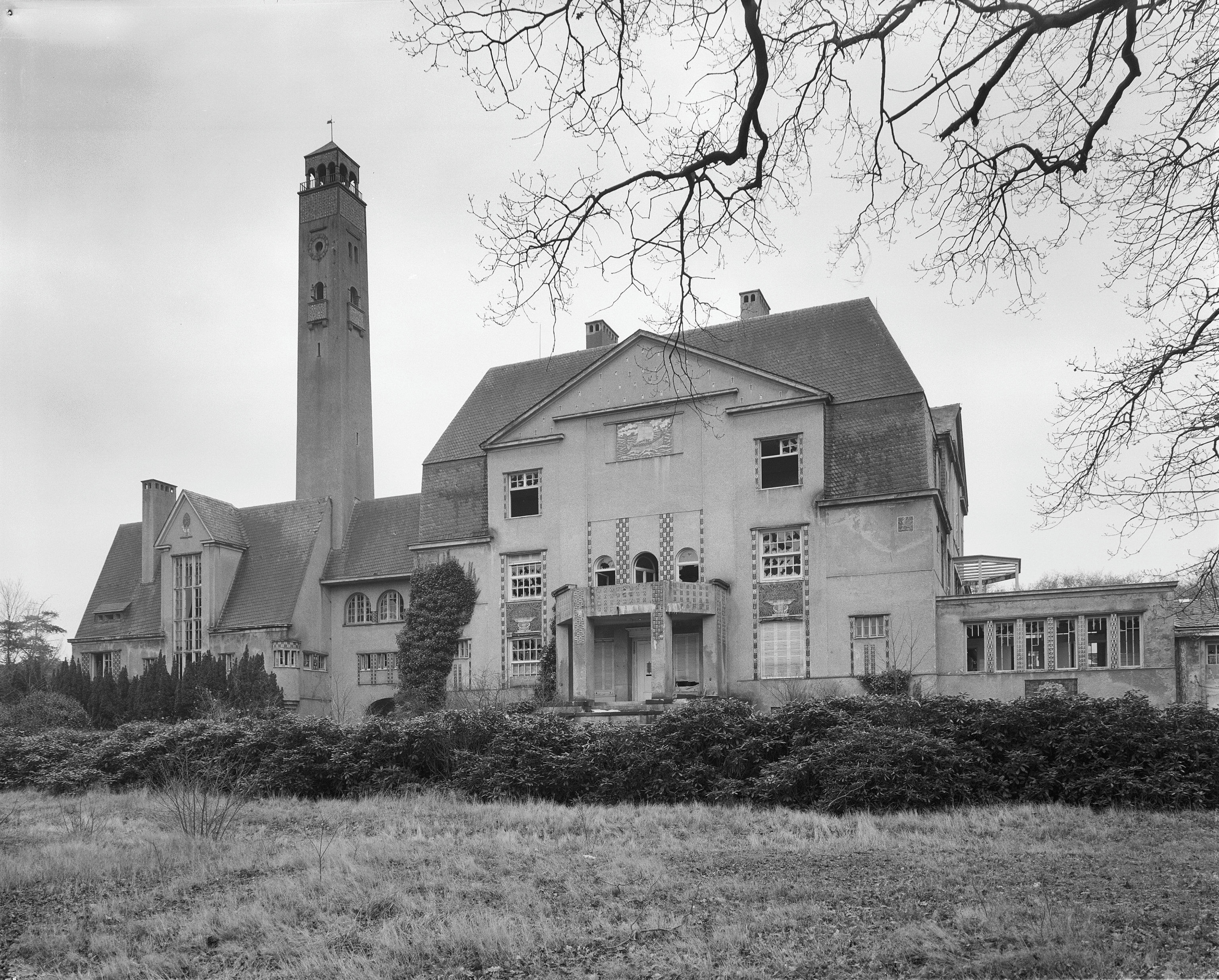
Kareol in 1978, facade

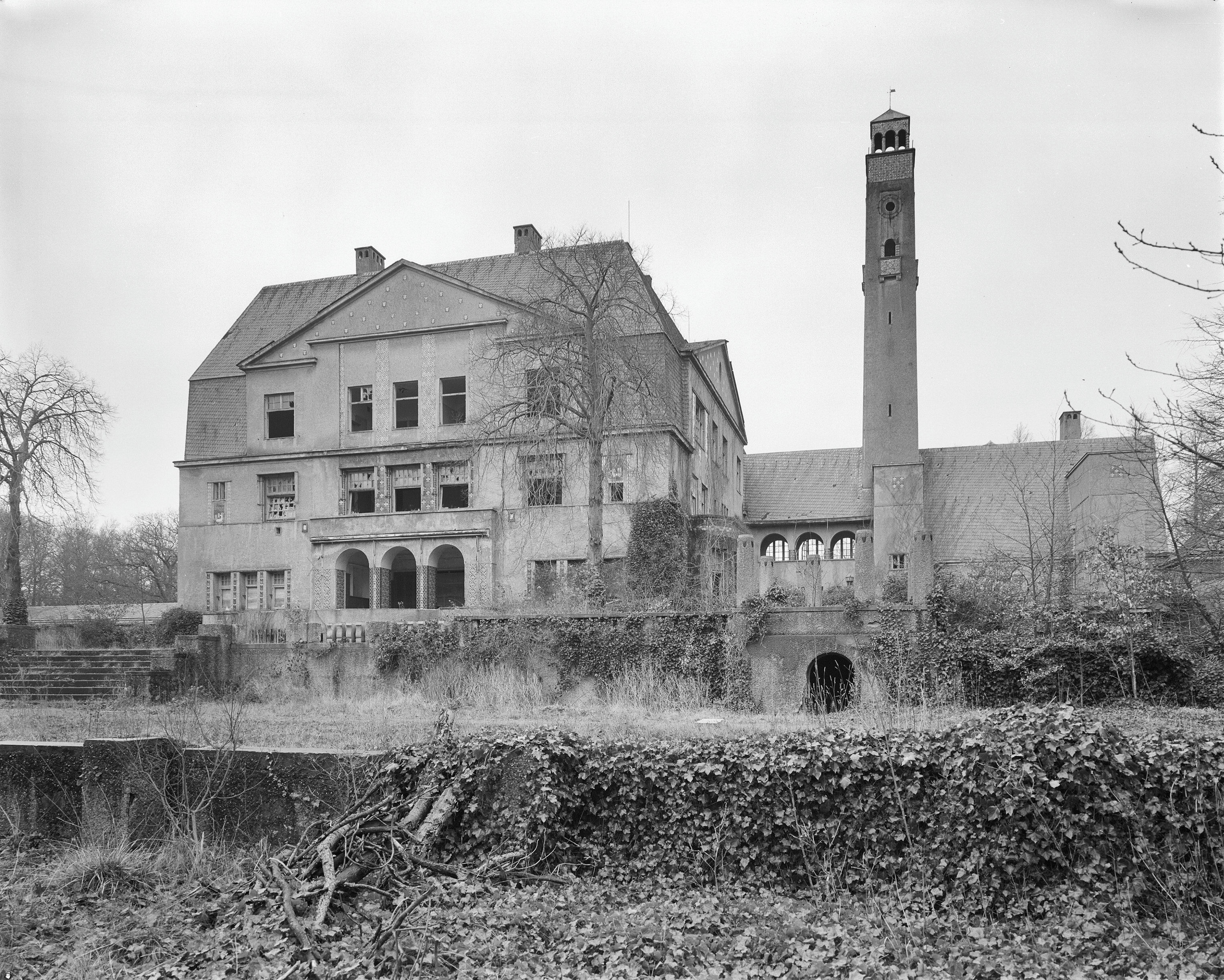
Kareol in 1978, back

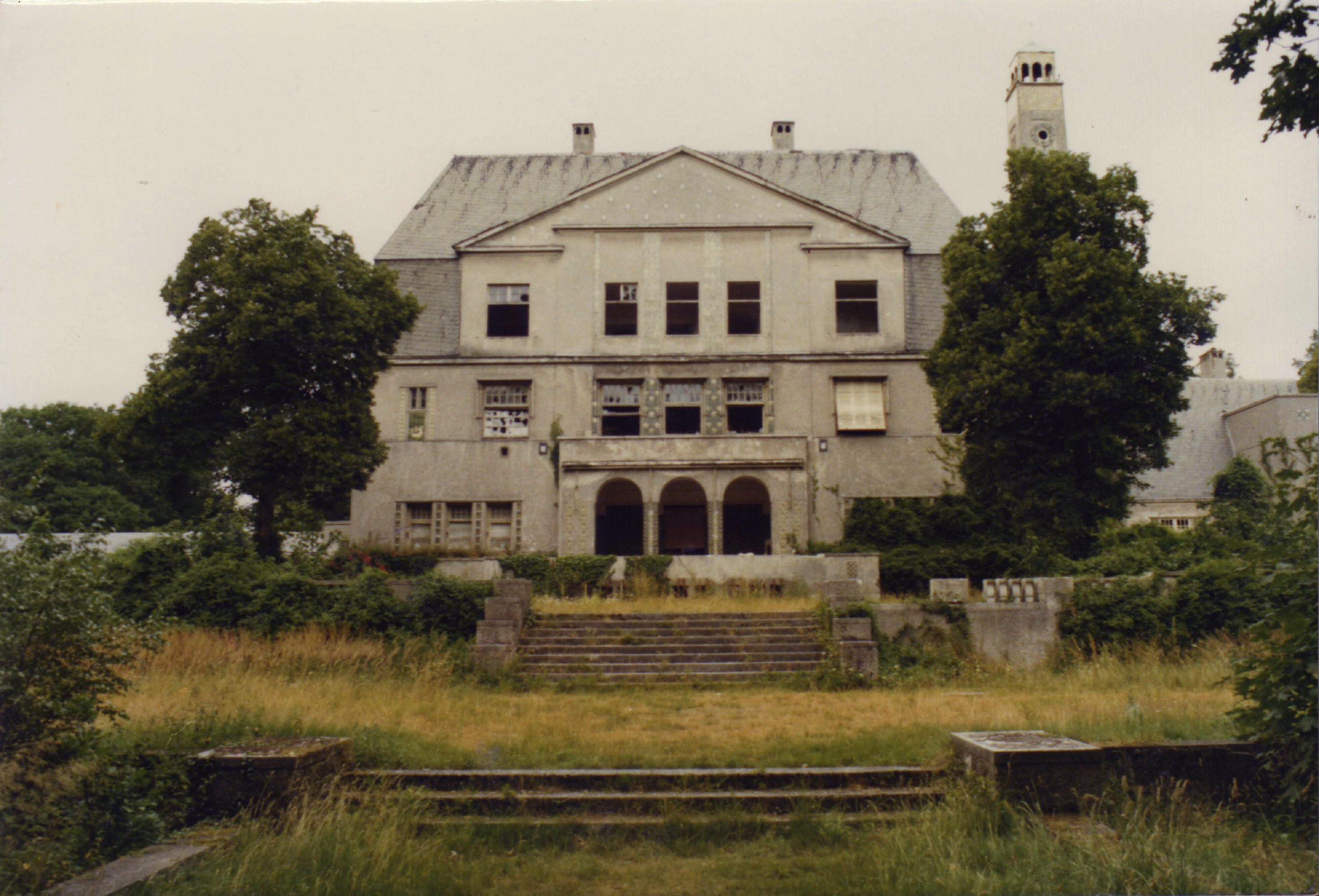
Kareol before destruction in 1979

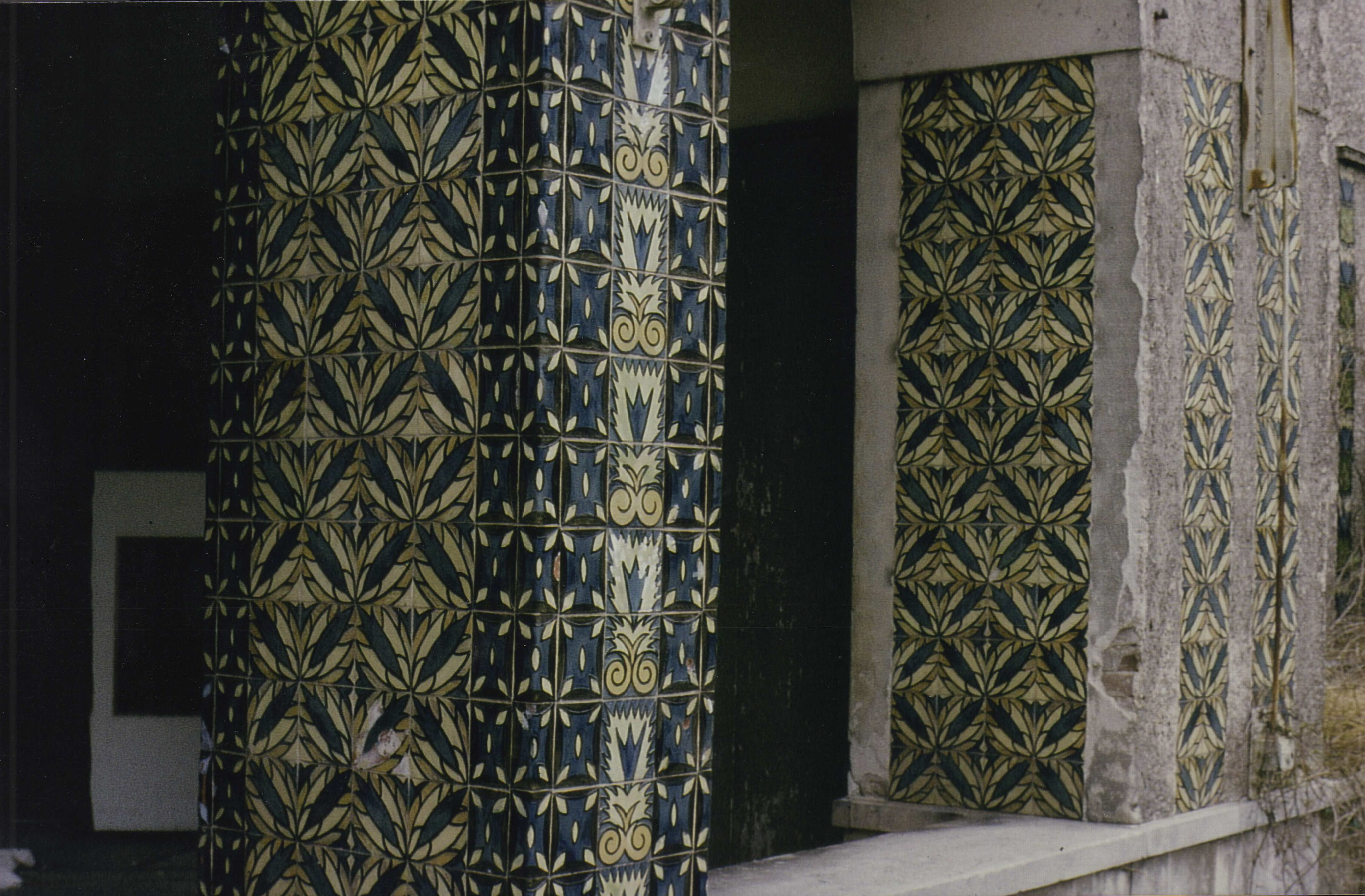
Tiled pillars, rear facade, 1979

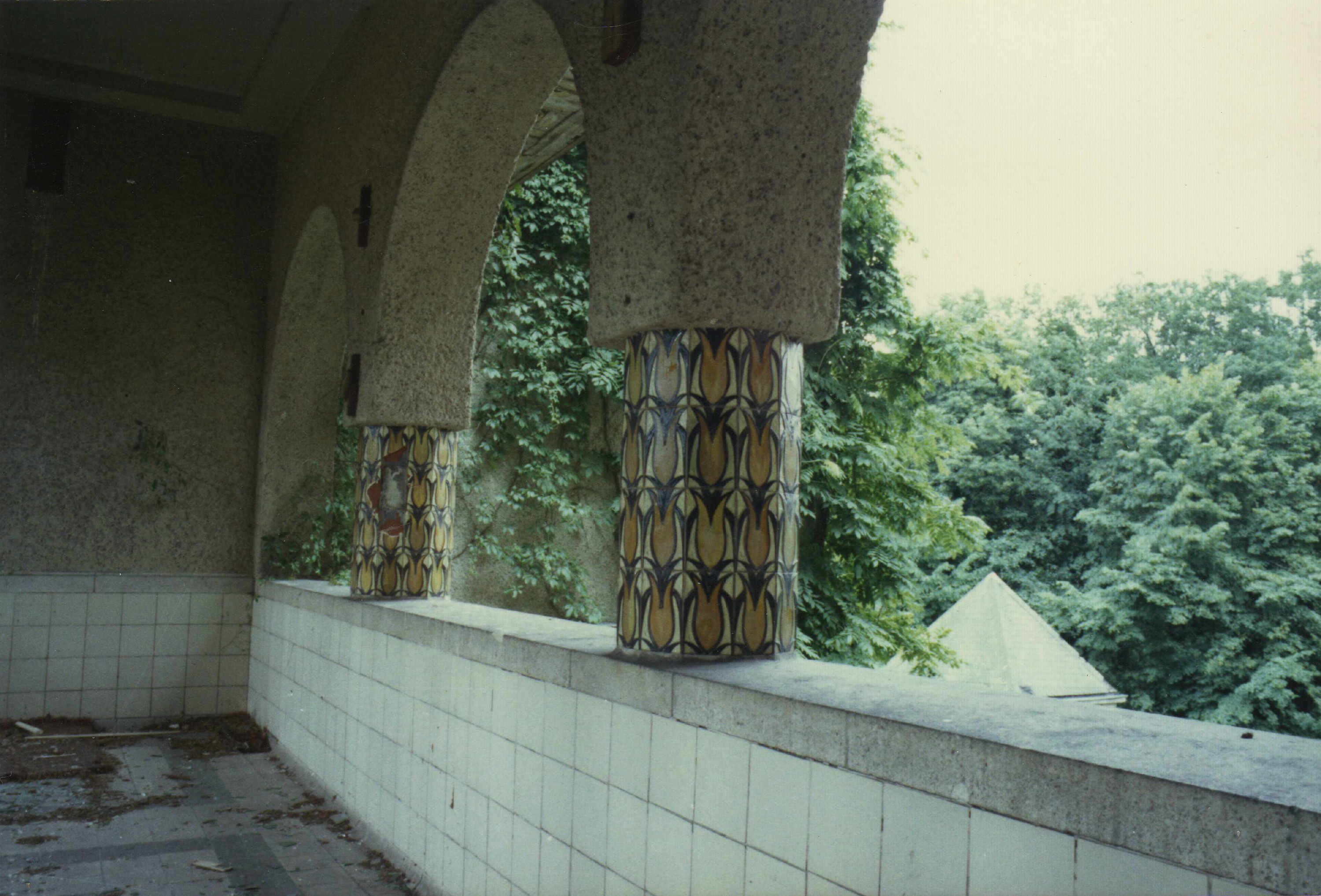
Gallery, 1979

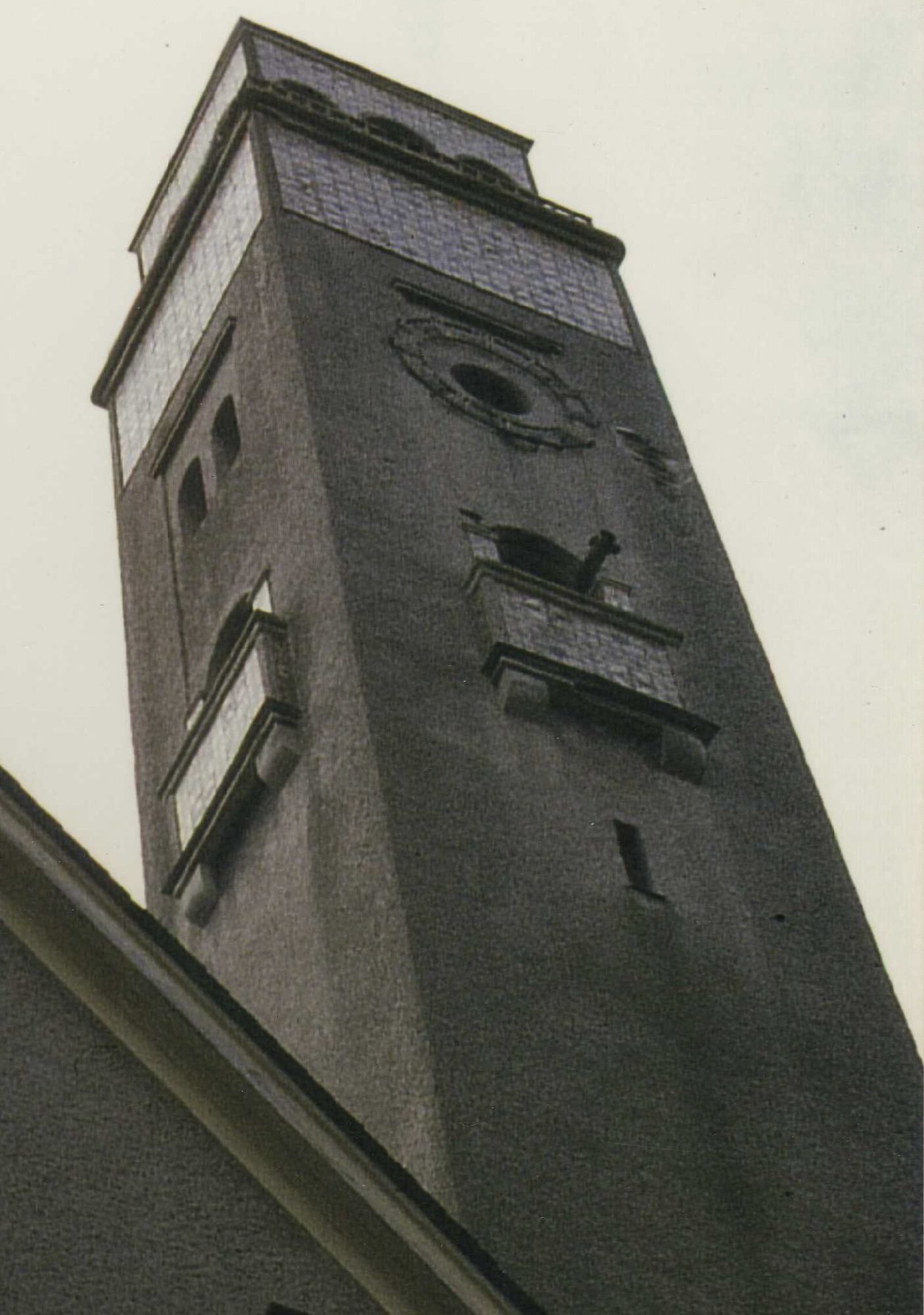
The water tower in 1979

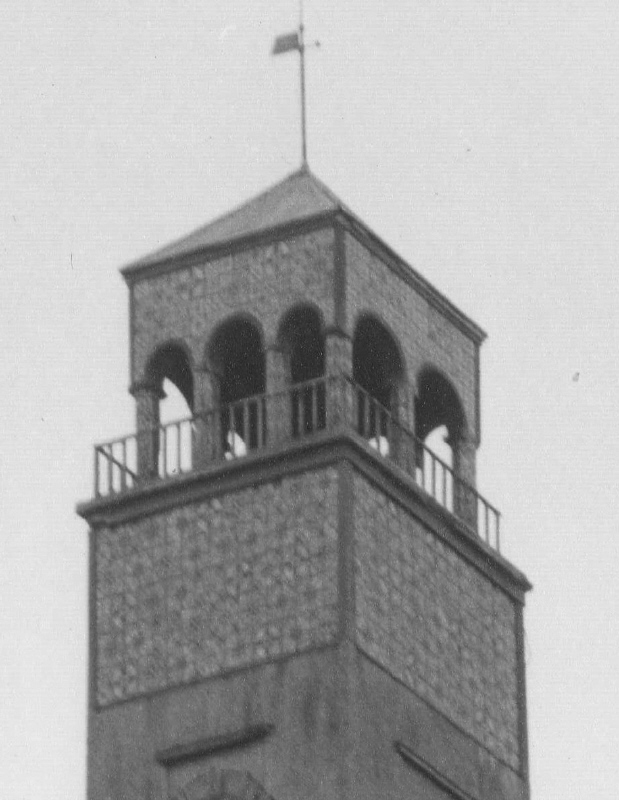
The tower

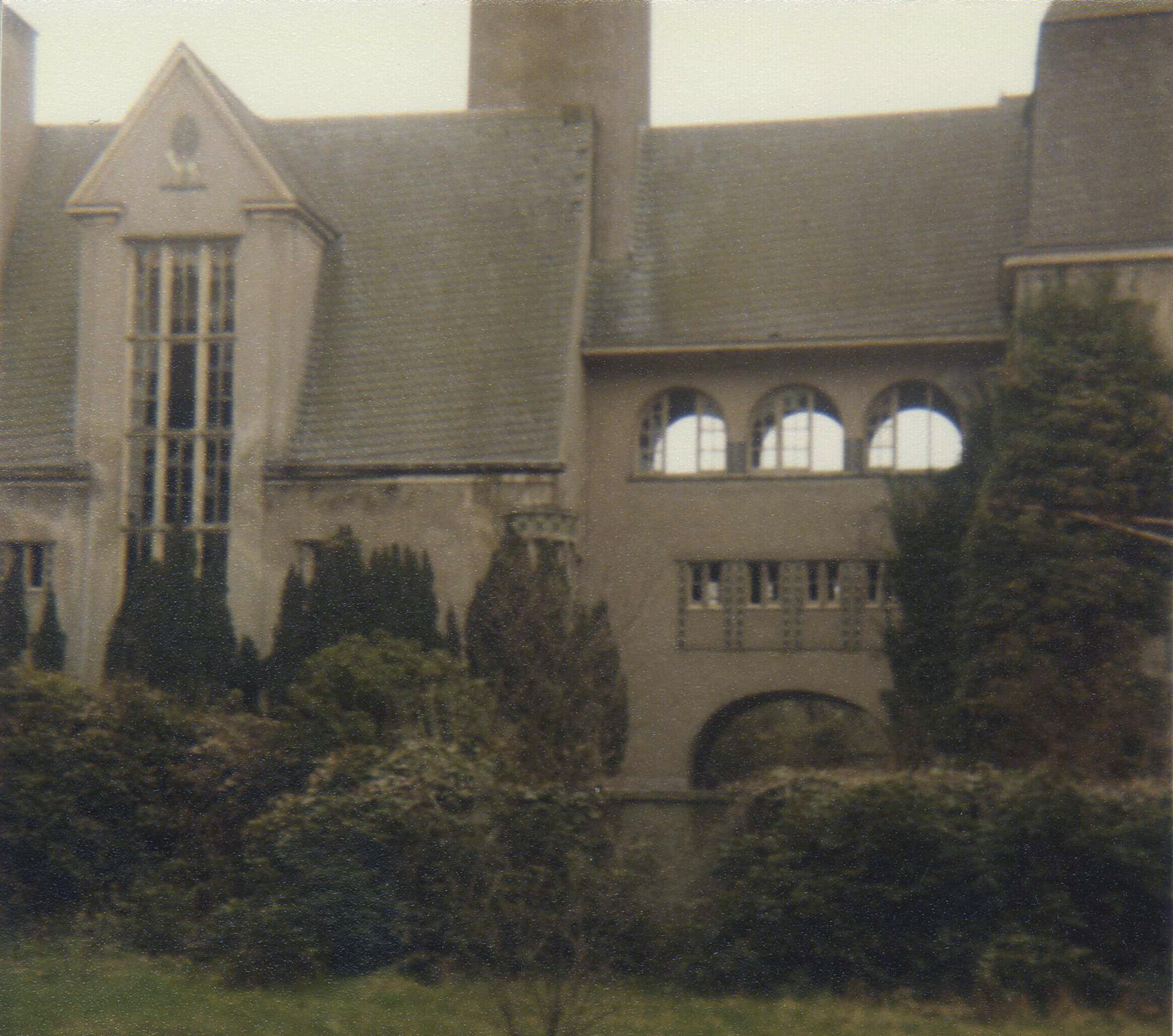
facade left

== Literature ==
- Hans van der Horst - Kareol, ondergang van een monument, 1980 ISBN 90 228 4097 2
- H. Slagter-Wieringa, N.J.P. Bersee - Kareol te Aerdenhout en zijn bouwheer, 1974 ISBN 90 6255 009 6
