= Aerdenhout =

- Village
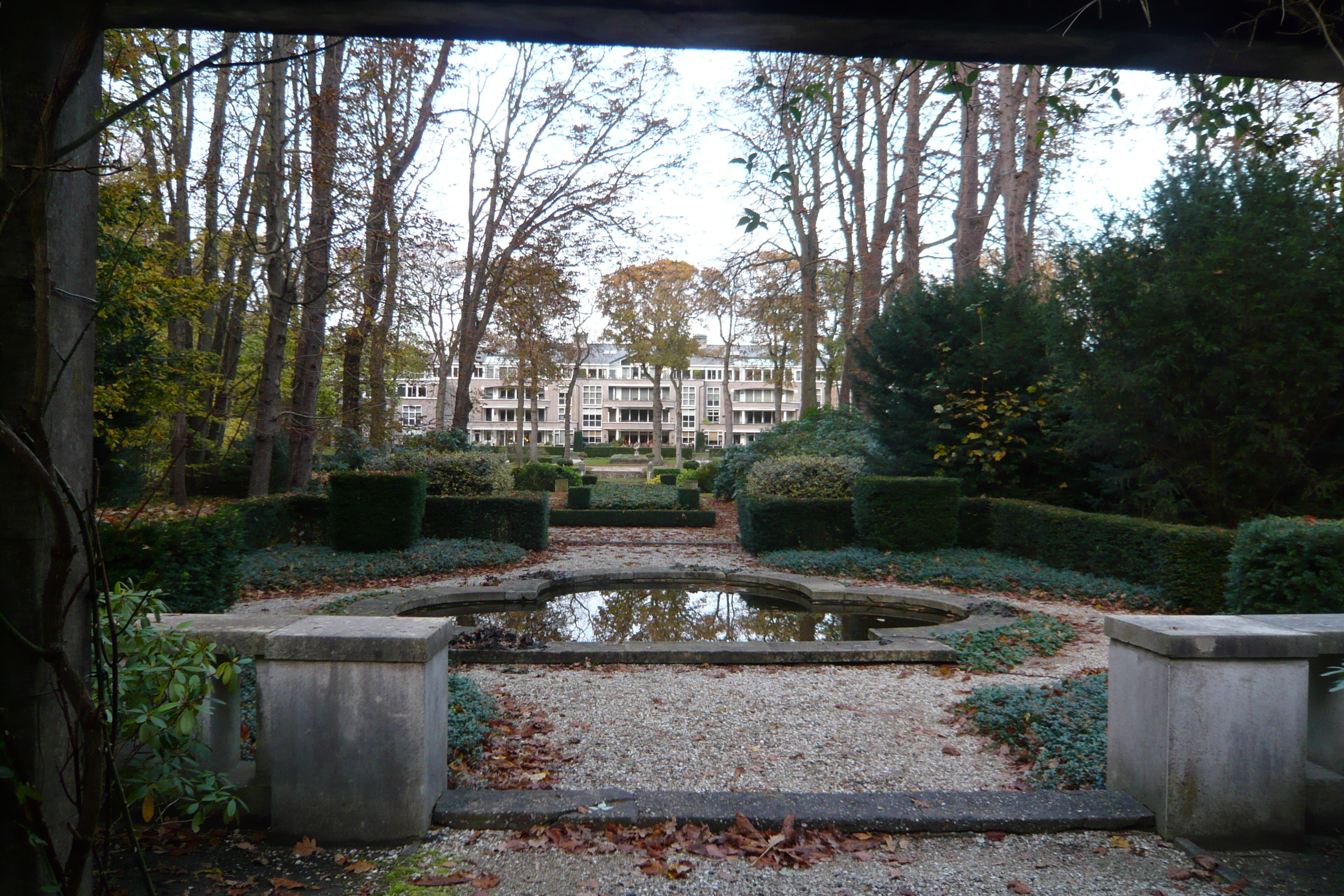
- Kareol park

- Location in the Netherlands Location in the province of North Holland in the Netherlands
- Coordinates: 52°21′52″N 4°35′50″E
- Country: Netherlands
- Province: North Holland
- Municipality: Bloemendaal

Area
  - Total: 5.78 km^{2} (2.23 sq mi)
- Elevation: 8 m (26 ft)

Population (2021)
  - Total: 4,730
  - Density: 818/km^{2} (2,120/sq mi)
- Time zone: UTC+1 (CET)
  - Summer (DST): UTC+2 (CEST)
- Postal code: 2111
- Dialing code: 023

Aerdenhout (Dutch pronunciation: [ˌaːrdə(n)ˈɦʌut]) is a village in the municipality of Bloemendaal, Netherlands. Located in the dunes between Haarlem and the beach town of Zandvoort, it ranks as the wealthiest town in the Netherlands. The name "Aerdenhout" means Andere hout, Dutch for "the other wood", and was given it to distinguish this other wood from the Haarlemmerhout, just south of the city Haarlem.

== Commuter town ==
Aerdenhout functions mostly as a suburb for wealthy commuters to Haarlem, Amsterdam, and other nearby cities. Residents of this village shop in nearby Heemstede, as Aerdenhout has virtually no shops.

The village Aerdenhout is dominated by many stately homes and villas, each with a unique style or architecture, and mostly built in the period 1920–1930. A much older building is the "Haringbuys", an old pub along the Zandvoorterweg. In old times fishermen from Zandvoort walked with their stocks through the dunes to the open market in Haarlem and they would take some rest and drink in the Haringbuys. Opposite this place is another old house situated: "Bosch en Landzigt". This is probably the oldest house in Aerdenhout. Actually, several people are living in this big building of which the cellars are several centuries old. There are still a few old trees in the garden. In the 20th century, mainly the families van Randwijck and Bierens de Haan were living in this historical house in Aerdenhout.

A special villa was Het Kareol. This large estate with a high water tower that could be seen from the train, was situated in a park with a small forest on the Van Lennepweg. The house was built in 1908 by the German owner Mr. Bunge who spent a lot of money on its construction. He liked the music of Richard Wagner and there were many tiles in the house with pictures referring to the opera Tristan and Isolde by Wagner. During the Second World War, the house was used as a sanatorium for wounded soldiers and suffered some damage. The Dutch Military Victims Association still has a magazine named the Kareoler. The house was demolished in the seventies and an apartment building was built on the same spot. The park grounds have been preserved.

During recent years, many new houses have been built in Aerdenhout without their own style, changing the character of the village.

== Sports clubs ==
Aerdenhout is home to the mixed Field Hockey Club "Rood-Wit" on the Zwaluwenweg 11.

== Railway transportation ==
In 1876, the railway station Heemstede-Aerdenhout railway station opened on the Amsterdam-Haarlem-Rotterdam railway line. It closed in 1880, but reopened in 1928.

== Notable residents ==
While the general Bloemendaal area is wealthy, it is not known for its celebrities. Notable people who live or lived in Aerdenhout include:

- Wubbo Ockels - First Dutchman in space
- Roel Pieper - Businessman and ex-vice president of the Phillips Corp
- Michael van Praag - former President of the Royal Dutch Football Association and former chairman of AFC Ajax
- Albert Heijn - Founder's son and previous owner of Ahold, one of the largest corporations in the Netherlands
- Dirk van den Broek - Businessman and founder of the Samenwerkende Dirk van den Broek Bedrijven
- Family Bleekemolen - Racing family, father Michael Bleekemolen and his two sons Sebastiaan and Jeroen
- Martijn Bolkestein - Member of the House of Representatives
- Gijs van Lennep - Racing driver
- Baskaran Kandiah - Businessman, co-founder and director of Lebara Group

== Gallery ==
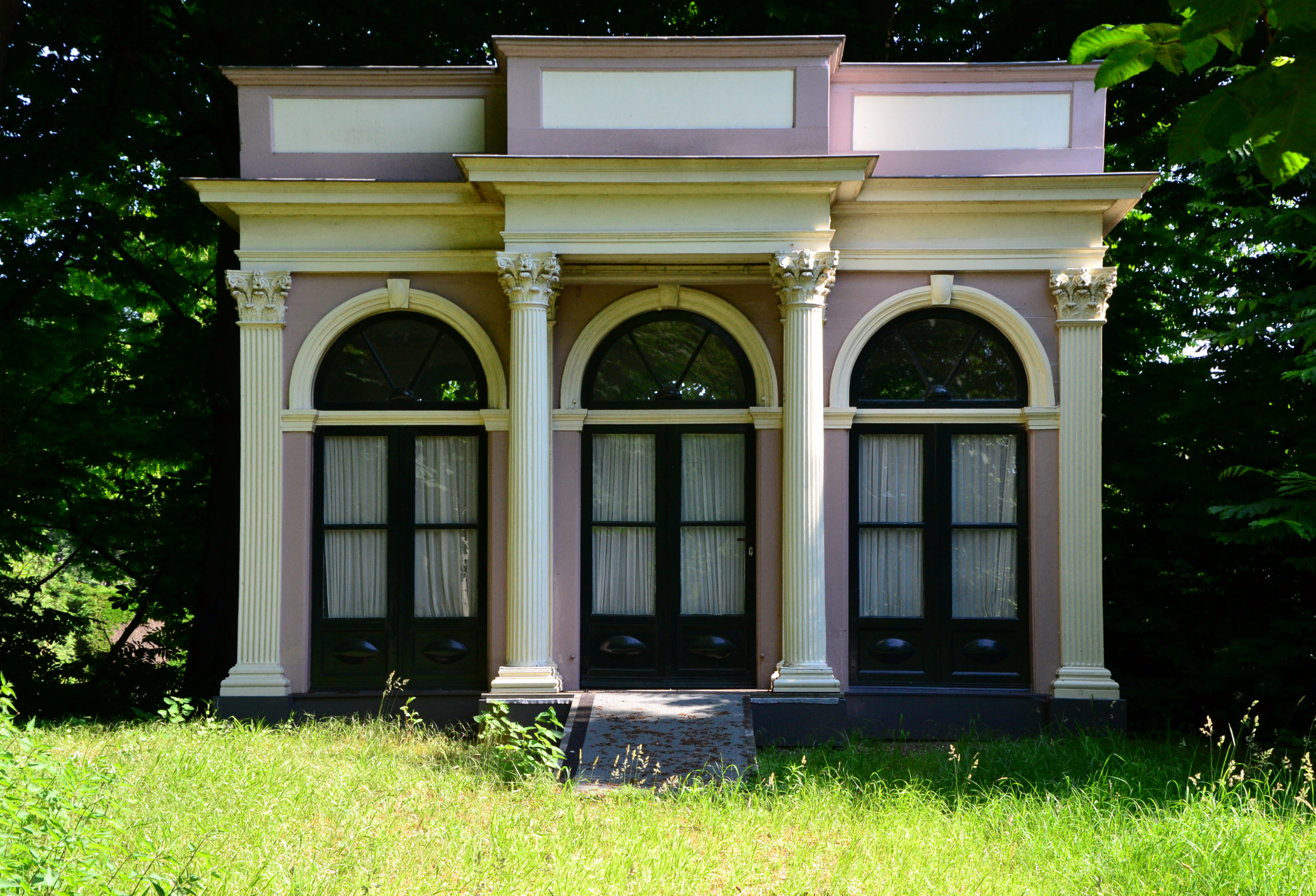
Tea house in Monastery Alverna

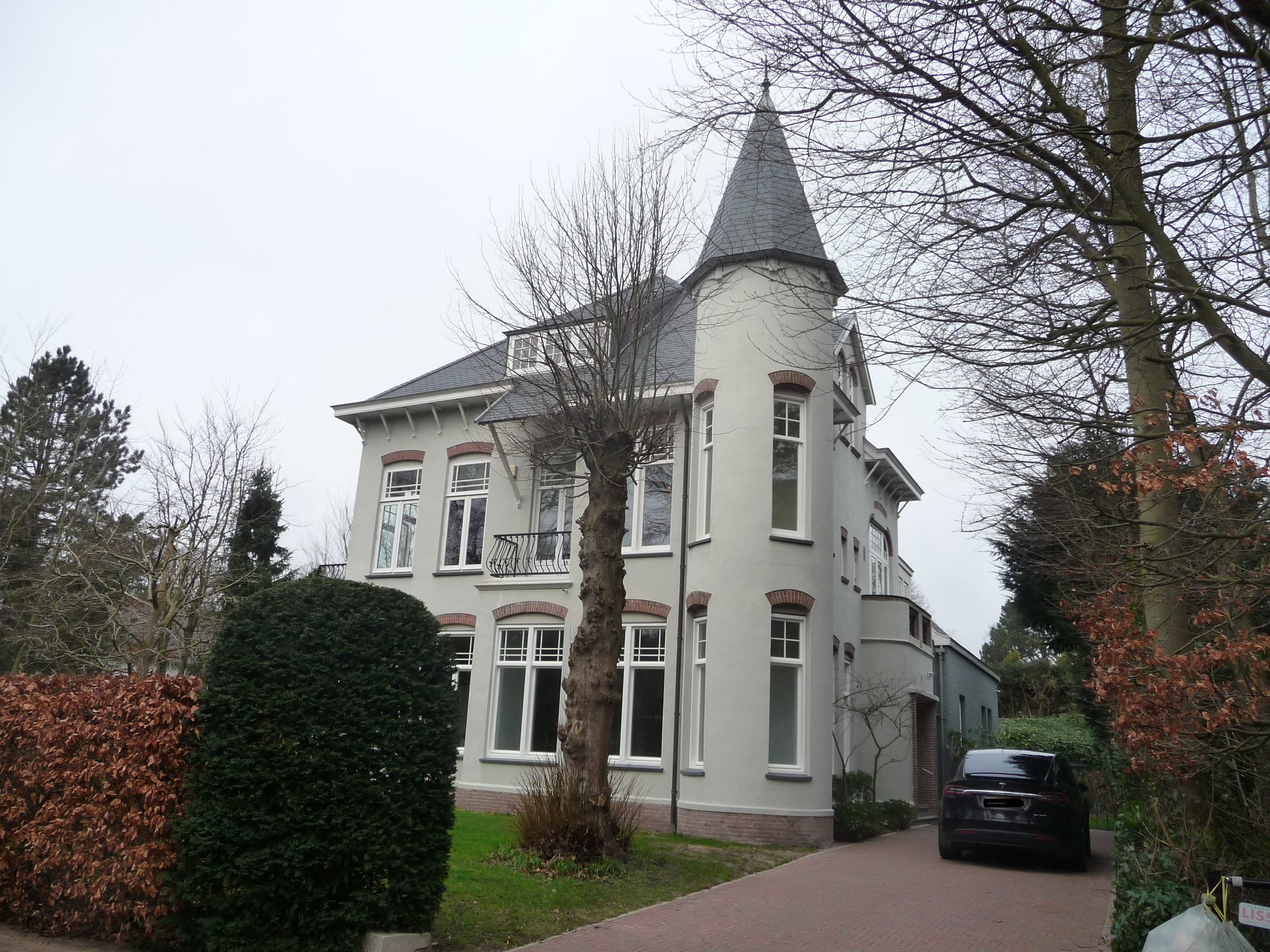
Villa in Aerdenhout

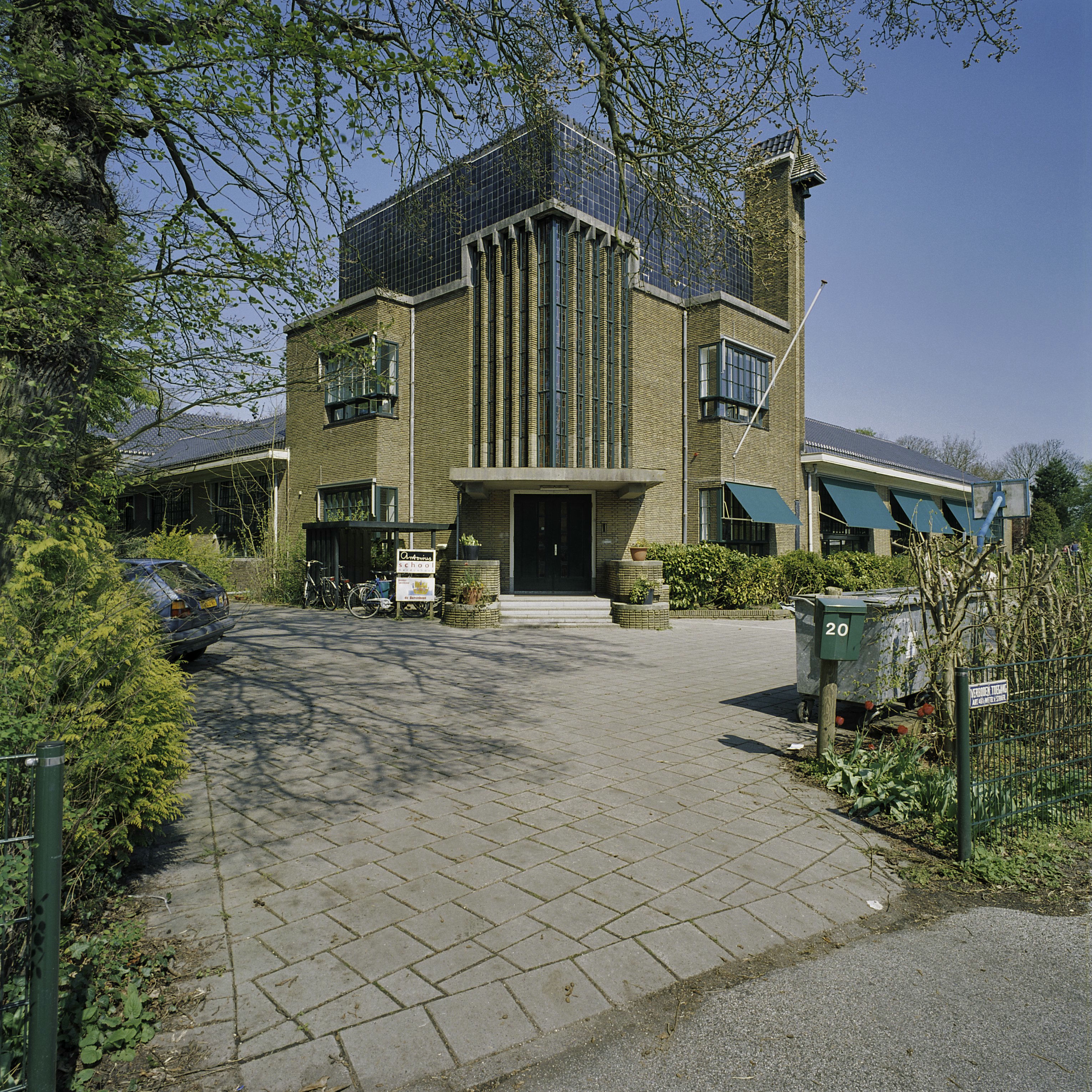
School

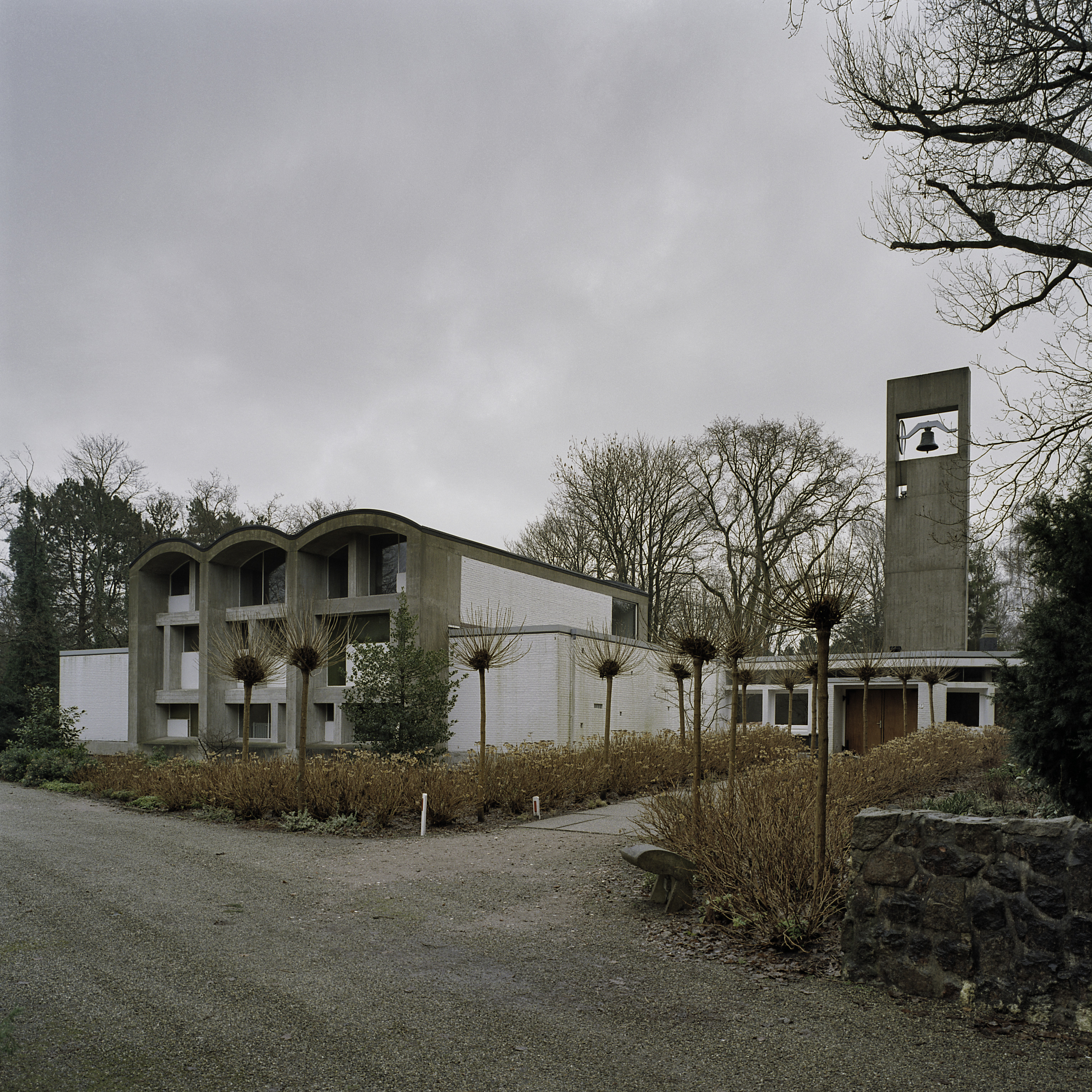
Church in Aerdenhout
