= Damien =

- Pronunciation: French: [damjɛ̃]

Origin
- Origin: Greece
- Region of origin: Europe

Other names
- Related names: Damian, Damiano

Damien is a given name and less frequently a surname.

The name is a French variation of Damian also used in the English-speaking world which comes from the Greek Damianos. This form originates from the Greek derived from the Greek word δαμάζω (damazō), "(I) conquer, master, overcome, tame", in the form of δαμάω/-ῶ (damaō), a form assumed as the first person of δαμᾷ (damāi)

== Given name ==
=== A ===
- Damien Abad (born 1980), French politician
- Damien Adam (born 1989), French politician
- Damien Adkins (born 1981), Australian rules footballer
- Damien Alamos (born 1990), French Muay Thai kickboxer
- Damien Alford (born 2001), Canadian football player
- Damien Allen (born 1986), English footballer
- Damien Anderson (born 1979), American football player
- Damien Angove (born 1970), Australian rules footballer
- Damien Arsenault, Canadian politician
- Damien Atkins (born 1975), Canadian actor and playwright

=== B ===
- Damien Balisson (born 1996), Mauritian footballer
- Damien Berry (born 1989), American football player
- Damien Birkinhead (born 1993), Australian shot putter
- Damien Blair (born 1972/1973), American basketball coach
- Damien Blanch (born 1983), Irish rugby union footballer
- Damien Bodie (born 1985), Australian actor
- Damien Boisseau, French voice actor
- Damien Bona (1955–2012), American film critic
- Damien Bonnard (born 1978), French actor
- Damien Borel (born 1993), American football player
- Damien Boudjemaa (born 1985), Algerian-French footballer
- Damien Bowen (born 1984), Australian shot putter
- Damien Bower (born 1980), Australian rugby union footballer
- Damien Bridonneau (born 1975), French footballer
- Damien Broderick (1944–2025), Australian writer
- Damien Broothaerts (born 1983), Belgian athlete
- Damien Brown (soccer) (born 1975), Australian footballer
- Damien Brown (fighter) (born 1984), Australian mixed martial artist
- Damien Brunner (born 1986), Swiss ice hockey player
- Damien Burke, Irish Gaelic footballer
- Damien Burroughs (born 1978), Australian Paralympic athlete
- Damien Bush (born 1968), English cricketer
- Damien Byrne (1954–2026), Irish footballer
- Damien Byrne (Gaelic footballer) (born 1978), Irish Gaelic footballer

=== C ===
- Damien Cahalane (born 1992), Irish hurler and footballer
- Damien Cardace (born 1992), French rugby league footballer
- Damien Carême (born 1960), French politician
- Damien Cely (born 1989), French diver
- Damien Chapman (born 1974), Australian rugby union footballer
- Damien Chazelle (born 1985), American director and screenwriter
- Damien Chouly (born 1985), French rugby union footballer
- Damien Christensen (born 1963), Australian rules footballer
- Damien Chrysostome (born 1982), Beninese footballer
- Damien Cler (born 1987), French rugby sevens player
- Damien Comer (born 1994), Irish sportsperson
- Damien Comolli (born 1972), French football coach
- Damien Cook (born 1991), Australian rugby league player
- Damien Corthésy (born 1988), French cyclist
- Damien Couturier (born 1981), French rugby union footballer
- Damien Covington (1972–2002), American football player
- Damien Cox (born 1961), Canadian journalist

=== D ===
- Damien Da Silva (born 1988), French footballer
- Damien De Bohun, Australian cricket administrator
- Damien Degboe, Beninese track athlete
- Damien Delaney (born 1981), Irish footballer
- Damien Delaney (Gaelic footballer) (born 1973), Irish Gaelic footballer
- Damien de Martel (1878–1940), French politician
- Damien Demento (born 1958), American professional wrestler
- Damien Dempsey (born 1975), Irish singer-songwriter
- Damien Denny (born 1966), Northern Irish boxer
- Damien Desprat (born 1974), French sailor
- Damien de Veuster (1840–1889), Belgian-Hawaiian Catholic priest
- Damien Djordjevic (born 1984), French figure skater
- Damien Doligez, French programmer
- Damien Done, an American post-punk band
- Damien Dovy (born 1966), French karateka
- Damien Duff (born 1979), Irish footballer
- Damien Dufour (born 1981), French footballer
- Damien Dussaut (born 1994), French footballer

=== E ===
- Damien Echols (born 1974), American writer
- Damien Egan, British politician
- Damien Éloi (born 1969), French table tennis player
- Damien English (born 1978), Irish politician
- Damien Escobar (born 1986), American violinist

=== F ===
- Damien Fahey (born 1980), American writer
- Damien Fahrenfort (born 1986), South African businessman
- Damien Fair, American neuroscientist
- Damien Farquet (born 1971), Swiss ski mountaineer
- Damien Farrell (born 1984), Antiguan footballer
- Damien Faulkner (born 1977), Irish race car driver
- Damien Félix, French singer-songwriter
- Damien Fitzhenry (born 1974), Irish hurler
- Damien Fitzpatrick (born 1989), Australian rugby union footballer
- Damien Fleming (born 1970), Australian cricketer
- Damien Fleury (born 1986), French ice hockey player
- Damien Fogarty (born 1985), Irish hurler
- Damien Fotiou, Australian actor
- Damien Fox (born 1961), Irish sportsperson
- Damien Francis (born 1979), Jamaican footballer
- Damien Frawley (born 1962), Australian rugby union footballer
- Damien Freeleagus, Australian actor
- Damien Freeman, Irish Gaelic footballer
- Damien Furtado (born 1997), French footballer

=== G ===
- Damien Garvey, Australian actor
- Damien Gaspar (born 1975), Australian rules footballer
- Damien Gaudin (born 1986), French cyclist
- Damien Germanier (born 1988), Swiss footballer
- Damien Gildea (born 1969), Australian mountaineer
- Damien Godet (born 1986), French cyclist
- Damien Gore (born 1999), Irish Gaelic footballer
- Damien Greaves (born 1977), British track athlete
- Damien Gregori, Irish musician
- Damien Gregorini (born 1979), French footballer
- Damien K. A. Griffith, Barbadian politician
- Damien Guillon (born 1981), French countertenor

=== H ===
- Damien Hancock (born 1965), Irish football referee
- Damien Hardman (born 1966), Australian surfer
- Damien Hardwick (born 1972), Australian rules footballer
- Damien Harris (born 1997), American football player
- Damien Hayes (born 1982), Irish sportsman
- Damien Healy, Irish Gaelic footballer
- Damiën Hertog (born 1974), Dutch footballer
- Damien Hétu (1926–2010), Canadian politician
- Damien Hill, Australian rugby union coach
- Damien Hirst (born 1965), British artist
- Damien Hobgood (born 1979), American surfer
- Damien Hooper (born 1992), Australian boxer
- Damien Horne (born 1978), American recording artist
- Damien Howson (born 1992), Australian cyclist
- Damien Hoyland (born 1994), Scottish rugby union footballer
- Damien Hudd (born 1981), Welsh rugby union footballer
- Damien Hughes, Anguillan football executive

=== I ===
- Damien Inglis (born 1995), French basketball player
- Damien Irwin (born 1969), Irish hurler

=== J ===
- Damien Jalet (born 1976), Belgian-French choreographer
- Damien Jefferson (born 1997), American basketball player
- Damien Johnson (born 1978), Northern Irish footballer
- Damien Joly (born 1992), French swimmer
- Damien Joyce (born 1980), Irish sportsperson
- Damien Jurado (born 1972), American singer-songwriter

=== K ===
- Damien Kane (born 1960), American professional wrestler
- Damien Keeping (born 1972), Australian rules football coach
- Damien Kelly (born 1958), Irish-American soccer player
- Damien Keown (born 1951), British bioethicist
- Damien Keyeux, French film editor
- Damien Kiberd, Irish journalist
- Damien Kingsbury (born 1955), Australian academic
- Damien Knabben (1941–2006), Belgian futsal coach
- Damien Kurek (born 1989/1990), Canadian politician

=== L ===
- Damien Lacey (born 1977), Welsh footballer
- Damien Lahaye (born 1984), Belgian footballer
- Damien Lauretta (born 1992), French actor
- Damien Leake (born 1952), American actor
- Damien Leith (born 1976), Irish-Australian musician and novelist
- Damien Leone, American director
- Damien LeRoy, American disc jockey
- Damien Le Tallec (born 1990), French-Russian footballer
- Damien Letulle (born 1973), French archer
- Damien Lewis (disambiguation), multiple people
- Damien Lock (born 1978), Australian rules footballer
- Damien Lovelock (1954–2019), Australian musician
- Damien Luce (born 1978), French pianist

=== M ===
- Damien MacKenzie (born 1980), Australian cricketer
- Damien Magee (born 1945), British auto racing driver
- Damien Magnifico (born 1991), American baseball player
- Damien Mahavony (born 1985), Malagasy footballer
- Damien Mama (born 1995), American football player
- Damien Mander (born 1979), Australian activist
- Damien Mantach, Australian politician
- Damien Marchesseault (1818–1868), American politician
- Damien Marcq (born 1988), French footballer
- Damien Margat (born 1983), French rower
- Damien Markman (born 1978), English footballer
- Damien Marsh (born 1971), Australian sprinter
- Damien Martin (born 1946), Irish hurler
- Damien Martyn (born 1971), Australian cricketer
- Damien McCaul, Gaelic footballer
- Damien McCaul (presenter), Irish radio presenter
- Damien McCormack (born 1987), Australian rules footballer
- Damien McCrory (born 1990), Irish footballer
- Damien McCusker (born 1966), Northern Irish Gaelic footballer
- Damien McCrystal (born 1961), English editor
- Damien McGrane (born 1971), Irish golfer
- Damien Mealey (born 1968), Australian cricketer
- Damien Megherbi, French producer
- Damien Menzo (born 1993), Dutch footballer
- Damien Meslot (born 1964), French politician
- Damien Miceli (born 1984), Belgian footballer
- Damien Miller, Australian diplomat
- Damien Molony (born 1984), Irish actor
- Damien Monier (born 1982), French cyclist
- Damien Moore (born 1980), British politician
- Damien Mostyn (born 1978), Australian rugby union footballer
- Damien Mouchamps (born 1996), Belgian footballer
- Damien Moulin (born 1987), French footballer
- Damien Moyal (born 1976), American musician
- Damien Mozika (born 1987), French footballer
- Damien Mudge (born 1976), Australian squash player
- Damien Murray (hurler) (born 1981), Irish hurler
- Damien Murray (footballer) (born 1970), Australian rules footballer

=== N ===
- Damien Nadarajah (born 1968), Sri Lankan cricketer
- Damien Nash (1982–2007), American football player
- Damien Nazon (born 1974), French cyclist
- Damien Neville (born 1975), Bahamian footballer
- Damien Nygaard (born 1945), Australian athlete

=== O ===
- Damien O'Connor (born 1958), New Zealand politician
- Damien O'Donnell (born 1967), Irish director
- Damien O'Hagan, Irish Gaelic footballer
- Damien O'Kane (born 1978), Irish musician
- Damien Oliver (born 1972), Australian jockey
- Damien O'Reilly (born 1967), Irish Gaelic footballer

=== P ===
- Damien Parer (1912–1944), Australian photographer and filmmaker
- Damien Patton (born 1972), American mechanic
- Damien Perquis (born 1984), French footballer
- Damien Perquis (footballer, born 1986) (born 1986), French footballer
- Damien Perrier (born 1989), French golfer
- Damien Perrinelle (born 1983), French footballer
- Damien Peverill (born 1979), Australian rules footballer
- Damien Pichereau (born 1988), French politician
- Damien Pignolet (born 1948), Australian chef
- Damien Piqueras (born 1991), French rower
- Damien Plessis (born 1988), French footballer
- Damien Poisblaud (born 1961), French cantor
- Damien Pottinger (born 1982), Canadian soccer player

=== Q ===
- Damien Quigley (born 1971), Irish sportsperson
- Damien Quinn (disambiguation), multiple people
- Damien Quintard (born 1991), French sound engineer

=== R ===
- Damien Raemy (born 1994), French motorcycle racer
- Damien Rafferty (fl. 2010s), Irish Gaelic footballer
- Damien Rascle (born 1980), French footballer
- Damien Raux (born 1984), French ice hockey player
- Damien Ravu (born 1994), Papua New Guinean cricketer
- Damien Reale (born 1981), Irish hurler
- Damien Reck (born 1998), Irish hurler
- Damien Reid, Scottish rugby league footballer
- Damien Renard (born 1980), French orienteer
- Damien Riat (born 1997), Swiss ice hockey player
- Damien Rice (born 1973), Irish singer-songwriter
- Damien Richardson (disambiguation), multiple people
- Damien Ricketson (born 1973), Australian composer
- Damien Roberts (born 1978), South African tennis player
- Damien Robin (born 1989), French footballer
- Damien Robinson (born 1973), American football player
- Damien Robitaille (born 1981), Canadian musician
- Damien Russell (born 1970), American football player
- Damien Ryan (basketball) (born 1978), Australian basketball player
- Damien Ryan (footballer) (born 1977), Australian rules footballer

=== S ===
- Damien Saez (born 1977), French singer-songwriter
- Damien Sandras, Belgian software designer
- Damien Sargue (born 1981), French singer
- Damien M. Schiff (born 1979), American lawyer
- Damien Schumann (born 1987), Australian volleyball player
- Damien Seguin (born 1979), French sailor
- Damien Shaw (born 1984), Irish cyclist
- Damien Sin (1965–2011), Singaporean author
- Damien Smith (disambiguation), multiple people
- Damien Starkey (born 1982), American producer
- Damien Sully (born 1974), Australian rules football umpire

=== T ===
- Damien Thomas (born 1942), British actor
- Damien Thomlinson, Australian para-snowboarder
- Damien Tibéri (born 1985), French footballer
- Damien Tiernan (born 1970), Irish journalist
- Damien Timmer (born 1968), British executive producer
- Damien Tixier (born 1980), French footballer
- Damien Top (born 1963), French musician
- Damien Touya (born 1975), French fencer
- Damien Touzé (born 1996), French cyclist
- Damien Traille (born 1979), French rugby union footballer
- Damien Troquenet, French canoeist
- Damien Tudehope (born 1953), Australian politician
- Damien Tussac (born 1988), German rugby union footballer

=== V ===
- Damien Valero (born 1965), French visual artist
- Damien Varley (born 1983), Irish rugby union footballer

=== W ===
- Damien Walters (born 1982), British gymnast
- Damien Dante Wayans (born 1980), American actor
- Damien Wayne (born 1971), American professional wrestler
- Damien Webber (born 1968), English footballer
- Damien Welch (born 1982), Welsh rugby union footballer
- Damien Whitehead (born 1979), English footballer
- Damien Wilkins (born 1980), American basketball player
- Damien Wilkins (writer) (born 1963), New Zealand novelist
- Damien Williams (born 1992), American football player
- Damien Wilson (born 1993), American football player
- Damien Woody (born 1977), American football player
- Damien Wright (born 1975), Australian cricketer

=== Y ===
- Damien Yzerbyt (1963–2014), Belgian politician

== Surname ==
- André Damien (1930–2019), French lawyer and politician

== Fictional characters ==
- Damien Karras, protagonist of the novel The Exorcist and its film adaptation of the same title.
- Damien Thorn, the main character in the Omen series of horror films and Damien TV series
- Damien Trotter, in the sitcom Only Fools and Horses
- Damien Thorn, from the television episode "Damien" from South Park
- Damien, from District 13
- Damien Darkblood, a character from the comic book series Invincible and its television adaptation of the same name

== See also ==
- Damian (disambiguation), includes people with the given name Damian
- Father Damien (disambiguation)
- Robert-François Damiens (1715–1757), Frenchman who unsuccessfully attempted the assassination of Louis XV of France
- Saint Damien (disambiguation)
- Damiano (given name)
