= Damion =

Damion is a given name. Notable people with the name include:

- Damion Barry, Trinidadian runner
- Damion Berger, British photographer
- Damion Cook, American football player
- Damion Dietz, American filmmaker
- Damion Easley, American baseball player
- Damion Fletcher, American football player
- Damion Hall, American R&B singer
- Damion Jacobs, Jamaican cricketer
- Damion James, American basketball player
- Damion Lee, American basketball player
- Damion Lowe, Jamaican footballer
- Damion McIntosh, American football player
- Damion Poitier, American actor and stuntman
- Damion Reid, American drummer
- Damion Scott, American comic book artist and writer
- Damion Searls, American writer and translator
- Damion Stewart, Jamaican footballer
- Damion Suomi, American musician
- Damion Square, American football player
- Damion Williams, Jamaican footballer
- Damion Whyte, Jamaica Rapper,

== See also ==
- Damian (disambiguation)
- Damien (disambiguation)
