= Damian =

Damian (Latin: Damianus) may refer to:

- Damian (given name)
- Damian (surname)
- Damian Subdistrict, in Longquanyi District, Chengdu, Sichuan, China

== See also ==
- Damiani, an Italian surname
- Damiano (disambiguation)
- Damien (disambiguation)
- Damon (disambiguation)
- Damion (disambiguation)
- San Damian (disambiguation)
