= Damien (play) =

- For the other uses of Damien, see Damien (disambiguation).

Damien is a 1976 one person show about Catholic missionary Father Damien, by Aldyth Morris. The play was originally performed in Hawaii in by Terence Knapp and has had numerous professional and amateur productions since that time.

The play is set in 1936 when Damien's body is being transported from Molokai to his native Belgium. Damien's story is retold through a series of flashbacks.

Damien featuring Terence Knapp was broadcast nationally on PBS in the United States in 1978 and again in 1986 on American Playhouse. The broadcast received a number of recognitions including a Peabody Award.

== Aldyth Morris (1901-1997) ==
Aldyth Vernon Morris was born 24 Aug 1901 in Logan, Cache County, Utah, USA, the second of six children born to Peter Weston and Fanny Maughan Vernon. After working in San Francisco and New York, Morris moved to Honolulu in 1929. She was for a number of years, managing editor of the University of Hawaii Press. She wrote eight plays; almost all of the protagonists have some connection to Hawaiian history. In 1978, Morris was awarded the "Hawai‘i Award for Literature".

=== Works ===
- Captain James Cook (1978)
- Lili'uokalani (1993)
- Robert Louis Stevenson Appointment on Moloka'i (1995)
