= Laura Noble =

English writer, gallerist and artist (born 1974)

Laura Noble (born 1974) is an English writer, gallerist and artist.

== Writing ==
Laura Noble has written for numerous publications including The Observer, Next Level, Foam, Snoecks and Image magazines. She was a regular columnist in London Independent Photography and Editor-at-large for Photoicon Magazine. She has written for a number of monographs and is the author of The Art of Collecting Photography.

== Diemar/Noble Photography ==
In 2009, after several years at The Photographers' Gallery she established the Diemar/Noble Photography Gallery in London. The gallery stocked and exhibited photography from the medium's early masters to contemporary work. In 2010, it was selected as the host gallery for the Prix Pictet commission by Ed Kashi. In the same year, Time Out called Diemar/Noble "one of the capital's top spots for photography." The gallery closed in August 2012.

== L A Noble Gallery ==
Noble founded L A Noble Gallery in September 2012. She is the sole director of the gallery, which is predominantly focused on contemporary photography.

She continues to consult and curate external exhibitions, including Robert Clayton's Estate at the Library of Birmingham.

=== FIX Photo Festival ===
FIX Photo launched in 2016, a free exhibition of photography produced and curated by Noble. FIX Photo is an annual event, with curator led tours, artist talks, film screenings and a programme of workshops. The 2017 edition of FIX Photo included 23 artists, with "over 300 pieces showcased along ten rooms and four floors". It was curated in response to the consequences of the dramatic political shifts of 2016.

The British Journal of Photography described the show as mixing "well-established photographers with little-known or emerging artists, and is gathered into four categories – identity, community, harmony & unity, and environment". This year also saw the first FIX Photo Festival Awards, an open competition judged by Noble, Chris Steele-Perkins, photographer Lottie Davies and Digital Camera Magazine editor, Ben Brain.

== Lectures and appearances ==
Noble is a visiting lecturer at Kingston University (2014–present), University of Westminster (2010–present), Falmouth University (2011–present) and Sotheby's Institute of Art, London (2013–present).

== Publications ==
- The Art of Collecting Photography. AVA, 2006. ISBN 2-88479-028-4, ISBN 978-2-88479-028-4
- With Lluis Real. London. John Rule Sales & Marketing, 2006. ISBN 84-611-2977-6, ISBN 978-84-611-2977-5
- With Jonathan Anderson, Edwin Low, Tex Light & Sie Dallas. Chrysalis. Light & Sie, 2007
- With Yvonne De Rosa, Sarah Milano. Crazy God. Damiani, 2008. ISBN 88-6208-020-4, ISBN 978-88-6208-020-0
- With Jonathan Anderson, Edwin Low. Circus. Lucky Panda, 2008
- With Jennie Gunhammar. Somewhere I have never travelled, gladly beyond. Damiani, 2009. ISBN 978-88-6208-081-1
- With Bertil Nilsson. Undisclosed: Images of the Contemporary Circus Artist. Canalside, 2011. ISBN 978-0-9568872-0-7
- With Damion Berger. In The Deep End. Schilt, 2011. ISBN 9053307133, ISBN 978-9053307137
- With Yvonne De Rosa, Sam Taylor-Johnson. Hidden Identities: Unfinished. Damiani, 2013. ISBN 886208269X, ISBN 978-8862082693
- With Robert Clayton, Jonathan Meades. Estate. Stay Free, 2015. ISBN 0993128408, ISBN 978-0993128400
- With Tom Broadbent. At home with the Furries. Stay Free, 2018. ISBN 0993128416, ISBN 978-0993128417
- With Chloe Rosser. Form & Function. Stay Free, 2018. ISBN 0993128424, ISBN 978-0993128424
- With Adriaan van Heerden. Unreal City. racked Earth, 2019. ISBN 0957539614, ISBN 978-0957539617
- With Joseph Ford. Invisible Jumpers. Hoxton Mini, 2019. ISBN 1910566586, ISBN 978-1910566589
- Contributor, edited by Odette England. Keeper of the Hearth: Picturing Roland Barthes’ Unseen Photograph. Schilt, 2020. ISBN 9053309373, ISBN 978-9053309377
- With Kai Weidenhöfer. Wall and Peace. Steidl, 2020. ISBN 9783958295711
