= Miano (disambiguation) =

Miano is a suburb of Naples.

Miano may also refer to:

- Miano (surname)
- Miano (Naples Metro)

== See also ==
- Mianos, a municipality in Zaragoza, Aragon, Spain
