= Alex Boyd (photographer) =

Scottish photographer

- Born: 15 July 1984 (age 42); Celle, West Germany
- Education: University of Glasgow, and Northumbria University.
- Occupation: Photographer
- Website: http://www.alex-boyd.com/

Alexander Boyd FRSA (born 15 July 1984) is a Scottish photographer and writer. He has published several books, and his work is included in both public and private collections including the Scottish National Portrait Gallery, The Yale Center for British Art, and the Royal Photographic Society collection held at the V&A.

== Life and work ==
=== Education ===
Boyd holds an MA (Hons) in History of Art from the University of Glasgow in 2007, and an MSc in Archival and Museum Studies from the Humanities and Advanced Technology and Information Institute (HATII) from the same institution in 2009. In 2023 Boyd was awarded a PhD from the University of Northumbria.

=== Projects ===
Boyd has worked on several long-term landscape photography projects that have concentrated on depictions of the Scottish and Irish landscape, with a particular focus on conservation, archaeology and issues such as the presence of the military in remote places.

==== Sonnets ====
The series Sonnets, a collaboration with Scottish Makar (Poet Laureate) Edwin Morgan made headlines in 2008 when Boyd had several of his works projected 84 metres high onto Europe's largest building, the Palace of the Parliament in Bucharest, and covered the entire University Square as part of the "White Night in Bucharest" Festival. In March 2010 Boyd's work was featured in a solo exhibition at the Scottish Parliament Building, where it was celebrated in a Parliamentary motion. In 2014 the series was displayed at the Museum of the Image in the Netherlands, and was the subject of a short film by director Michael Prince. In 2009 Boyd also worked with Edwin Morgan when he participated in Anthony Gormley's One and Other in Trafalgar Square in London.

==== Point of the Deliverance / Point a' Tarrthaidh ====
In 2012 Boyd began work on The Point of the Deliverance when he was appointed a Fellow of the Ballinglen Arts Foundation in the Republic of Ireland. The series documents a special area of conservation and the issues facing it due to the development of the Corrib Gas project, which resulted in the Corrib Gas Controversy. With an antique field camera, Boyd worked intensively for 3 months across the area, using the wet-plate collodion process to document local people and landscapes, paying special attention to sites of archaeological and historical significance.

A labour-intensive process, using wet-plate collodion required Boyd to carry equipment over several miles of moorland, including chemicals, a dark tent, and the camera itself. Images from the series were exhibited at the Royal Ulster Academy, and would form the basis an ongoing project to document the edges of the Irish Gaeltacht and the Scottish Gàidhealtachd. Boyd was announced as the Royal Scottish Academy's Artist in Residence at Sabhal Mor Ostaig on the Isle of Skye in Scotland for 2012–13, a role which would see his work explore Scottish Gaelic culture and landscape. Working with acclaimed Japanese photographer Takeshi Shikama, Boyd made work focusing on the Cuillin mountain range and the Quiraing, as well as the clearance villages of Skye. The series also took Boyd to the Outer Hebrides, documenting the landscapes of Lewis and Harris as well as the remote archipelago of St Kilda. The resultant large-scale prints were displayed prominently at the Royal Scottish Academy as part of their Resident 13 Exhibition in Winter 2013.

The series was released as a publication by Kozu Books in 2023, with extensive coverage in National Geographic, The British Journal of Photography, The Times, The BBC and Black and White magazine among others. It features contributions from writer David Gange, poet Moya Cannon and artist Will Maclean.

==== Land of the Army / Tìr an Airm ====
In 2017 Boyd released the Saltire Award shortlisted book St Kilda - The Silent Islands, a study of the North Atlantic islands that are home to a World Heritage Site and an active military base using a camera which once used to photographer Fay Godwin. This work served as the foundation for Tìr an Airm, a study of Scotland's military training areas, the Defence Training Estate. Exhibited at Stills Gallery in Edinburgh in 2021, the series concentrated on the bombing ranges of Cape Wrath, Tain Air Weapons Range, Kirkcudbright Training Centre, and the Dundrennan Range, the site of Depleted Uranium testing. An accompanying film featured a narration in Gaelic by Mary Ann Kennedy.

==== Other projects ====
A commission for the 'Year of Natural Scotland' and Cape Farewell, a series of artists were asked to respond to the peatland landscape of the Isle of Lewis, celebrating the role which the blanket bog moorland plays towards global climate regulation. Boyd spent several weeks working on and in the landscape, visiting Shielings at the heart of the moorland while recording archaeological finds, and learning about life on the moor from artist and resident Anne Campbell. The resultant series of work Stacashal was exhibited throughout Scotland in 2013, most notably at the Royal Botanics in Edinburgh, and was made using the photogravure process. A second body of work called The Isle of Rust (An t-Eilean Ruadh) was also exhibited, utilising rust from abandoned moorland machinery to produce images of Lewis using the collodion process. Boyd would later publish the series as a book in 2019, featuring an introductory essay by writer and critic Jonathan Meades and academic Dan Hicks.

=== Film and television ===
In 2011 as part of the Glasgow Film Festival a short film 'Sonnets' about Boyd's work was shown at the GFT. In 2012 Boyd appeared in a BBC series about Victorian photographer Francis Frith alongside presenter John Sergeant, explaining and demonstrating the wet-plate collodion process at Stirling Castle. In 2013 Boyd worked alongside notable fashion photographer Rankin discussing the work of early photographic pioneers Hill & Adamson on the ITV programme Britain's Secret Homes. Using the same Edinburgh studio used by Robert Adamson, a calotype portrait of Rankin was created by Boyd and Fionnbharr Ó Súilleabháin during a snowstorm. More recently Boyd appeared on the BBC series Grand Tours of Scotland's Lochs talking to presenter Paul Murton about photographer George Washington Wilson.

=== Other activities ===
Boyd has worked as an academic, producing several peer-reviewed articles. He has also worked as a Museum Curator, and in 2012 was congratulated by the Scottish Parliament for his work in increasing access to heritage and archaeological objects in the South West of Scotland. He was involved in the campaign for Scottish Independence, and was an early member of arts organisation National Collective, being named as one of their Cultural Ambassadors in 2012. His images were included in the publication 'Inspired by Independence' with a body of work titled 'Shadow on the Landscape' examining the role of RNAD Coulport, home of the UK's strategic nuclear deterrent. Boyd is a Fellow of the Winston Churchill Memorial Trust, a member of Accademia Apulia, and a Fellow of the Royal Society of Arts.

In 2014 Boyd worked with artist and composer Hanna Tuulikki on her project Away With the Birds for the 2014 Commonwealth Games, as well as providing album artwork for BBC Folk singer of the year Bella Hardy.

In 2021 Boyd released two books to raise money for charity. The first ‘The Broken Land’ with Australian musician and writer Nick Cave, and the second ‘Hallaig’ featured the work of poet Sorley Maclean.

Throughout 2022 and 2023, Boyd has been actively involved in "Looking North Through Art," a public engagement platform. As part of the program, he has delivered two talks, contributing to the platform's mission of fostering dialogue about landscape and energy ethics in Scotland and beyond.

According to the John Muir Trust, Boyd is currently writing and researching a book on the cultural history of Scotland's mountain landscapes. He is also a regular contributor to Archipelago magazine.

== Publications ==
- The Point of the Deliverance. Kozu Books, 2023. ISBN 978-1-919617-69-5
- The Isle of Rust: A Portrait of Lewis and Harris. Luath Books, 2019. ISBN 978-1-908337-21-4
- St Kilda - The Silent Islands. Luath Books, 2018. ISBN 978-1-913025-00-7

== Awards ==
- 2010 The Dewar Award
- 2010 Arts Trust for Scotland Award
- 2012 Arts Trust for Scotland Award
- 2012 Ballinglen Arts Foundation Fellowship
- 2012 Fellow of the Winston Churchill Memorial Trust
- 2012 Fellow of the Royal Society of Arts
- 2018 Fellow of the National Library of Scotland
- 2021 Fellow of the Society of Antiquaries of Scotland

== Collections ==
Boyd's work is held by the following public collections:

- National Gallery of Scotland.
- Yale Center for British Art.
- Royal Scottish Academy.
- The collections of The University of Glasgow, University of St Andrews, The University of the Highlands & Islands and Sabhal Mòr Ostaig
- The Scottish Maritime Museum.

== Exhibitions ==
Solo exhibitions

- 2023 The Remote Part, Perth Centre of Photography, Australia
- 2021 Tir an Airm, Stills Gallery, Edinburgh
- 2021 St Kilda - The Silent Islands, An Lanntair, The Isle of Lewis, Scotland
- 2014 The Sky, The Land, The Sea (10 years of Landscape Photography), Kendal Arts Centre
- 2014 Portraits of Experience, The Scottish Maritime Museum
- 2013 The Hebrides, Sabhal Mòr Ostaig, Isle of Skye
- 2010 Sonnets from Scotland, The Scottish Parliament, Edinburgh
- 2008 Sonnets from Scotland, The Arches, Glasgow, Scotland
- 2007 A Man Without A Country, Fulham Palace, London

Group exhibitions

- 2023 Cré - Believing Earth, The National Folk Theatre of Ireland, Tralee, Ireland
- 2022 Collective, Perth Centre for Photography, Perth, Australia
- 2018 SSA / VAS Exhibition, Royal Scottish Academy, Edinburgh
- 2017 Ages of Wonder Royal Scottish Academy, Edinburgh
- 2015 Royal Academy Summer Exhibition, The Royal Academy of Arts, London
- 2014 The Wanderer, Museum of the Image, Breda, Netherlands
- 2014 Scottish Scenic Routes, The Lighthouse, Glasgow
- 2013 Sea Change/Land of My Desire, The Royal Botanic Gardens, Edinburgh
- 2013 Tir Mo Ruin, Inverness Museum & Art Gallery
- 2013 Resident 13, Royal Scottish Academy, Edinburgh
- 2012 Project 30: New Perspectives From Ireland, Gallery of Photography, Dublin, Ireland
- 2011 Accademia Apulia Awards Royal Horseguards, London
- 2010 TULCA Arts Festival, Galway Ireland
- 2009 Imagine 2009 EU Photography Awards – European Parliament Building, Brussels
- 2009 Imagine 2009 EU Photography Awards – Swedish Parliament, Stockholm
- 2009 Scottish Photographers – Lillie Gallery, Glasgow
- 2007 Retro Future, Fulham Palace, London
