= Damiano =

Damiano may refer to:

- Damiano (surname)
- Damiano (given name)
- Damiano, Pella, village in Pella regional unit, Greece
- Damiano Defence, a series of chess opening moves

== See also ==
- San Damiano (disambiguation)
