= Yvonne De Rosa =

Italian photographer (born 1975)

Yvonne De Rosa (born 21 October 1975 in Naples), is an Italian photographer.

== Biography ==
Yvonne De Rosa graduated in political science, then relocated to London, where she studied at Central Saint Martins College of Art & Design. She has subsequently exhibited photographs.

In 2006, she was awarded the "Women International Prize in Photography" and shortlisted for the “Association of Photographers Open", whilst in 2007, her series Afterdark was awarded First Prize in Fine Art Landscapes at the International Photography Awards (IPA). Later that year, her debut book Crazy God won an award from the World Health Organization and was exhibited at "The World Conference on Poverty and Health" in Venice. Her second book, Hidden Identities, Unfinished, published in 2013, has been presented with a solo show at the V&A Museum of Childhood of London.

Her work was commissioned and showcased as part of the “One Gallery, One Night: Emerging Women in Photography” exhibition, sponsored by Kodak.

She is a founding member of the group 24, which exhibited work in unlikely places, such as Soho and Trafalgar Square.

In 2020, her work “correspondence" was shown in Iran at the Hasht Cheshmeh Art Space of Kashan.

De Rosa's research is now focused on the representation of memory and truth and on the documentary and narrative aspects of photography. The artist often proceeds by doing research, aimed at reconstructing the story of unknown people met by chance. To do this, she retrieves objects in the markets, speaks with possible witnesses still alive, and takes photographs in the key places of the narration. After patiently collecting all the clues and traces, De Rosa builds photographic shots of what happened.

She currently lives between Naples and London, where she works as a freelance photographer.

== Exhibitions ==
- Crazy God Solo Exhibition, INTERNATIONAL FESTIVAL OF CONTEMPORARY ARTS – CITY OF WOMEN, Ljubljana, 2010
- Crazy God Solo Exhibition, Diemar/Noble Photography, London, 2010
- Crazy God Solo Exhibition, PAN - Palazzo delle Arti di Napoli, 13 Dec 2008 - 2 Feb 2009
- Crazy God Solo Exhibition, Redchurch Street, E2, Presented by The Cynthia Corbett Gallery, London, 2008
- 24:2008 Group exhibition at AOP Association of Photographers Gallery, 2008
- Bridge Art Fair, London, Delayed Dreams, The Cynthia Corbett Gallery, London, 2007
- Berliner Liste, Berlin, The Cynthia Corbett Gallery, London, 2007
- 24:2007. SSROBIN Gallery. Canary Wharf, London, 2007
- Red Dot Art Fair New York, The Cynthia Corbett Gallery, London, 2007
- Yvonne de Rosa contacts, Christina Benz liquid, Trafalgar Hotel, Trafalgar Square, London, The Cynthia Corbett Gallery, 2007
- Art 212, Contemporary Art Fair NYC, The Cynthia Corbett Gallery, London, 2006
- contacts, Solo Exhibition at the Blenheim Gallery, Notting Hill, The Cynthia Corbett Gallery, London, 2006
- Nova Art Fair Chicago, The Cynthia Corbett Gallery, London, 2006
- 24:2006, Trafalgar Hotel, Trafalgar Square, London, 2006
- Women in Photography International Exhibition, One Gallery, One Night, One Chance _ sponsored by Kodak, The hospital, London, 2005
- AAF Contemporary Art Fair NYC, The Cynthia Corbett Gallery, London, 2005
- Rollo Contemporary Art – “The Writer”, Series of Photographs of the Work of Giancarlo Neri, London, 2005
- artLondon, The Cynthia Corbett Gallery, London, 2005
- Glasgow Art Fair, The Cynthia Corbett Gallery, London, 2005
- Dance project, Hampstead, London, 2005
- 24, Soho Square, London, 2005
- Arco Madrid, The Cynthia Corbett Gallery, London, 2005
- 24, Mezzo Café, unfinished London College of Communication, 2003
- Exhibition at Italsider space in Naples, 2002
- V&A Museum of Childhood, London, 2014 / 2015

== Awards ==
2007

- Crazy God selected by The World Health Organization & showcased at the World Conference on Poverty and Health.
- International Photography Award (IPA)
- Prize in the category of Professional Photographer of the Year (Fine Art)

2006

- Awarded the “Woman International Prize in Photography”
- The Association of Photographers Annual AOP Open (Shortlisted)

== Publication ==
- With Sarah Emily Miano (text), Laura Noble (preface). Crazy God. Published by Damiani, 2008. ISBN 88-6208-020-4, ISBN 978-88-6208-020-0
- Hidden Identities, Unfinished. Published by Damiani, 2013. ISBN 886208269X ISBN 978-8862082693

== Selected Commissions ==
2005

- Photographic interpretation of "The Writer" in Hampstead Heath by Giancarlo Neri. Commissioned by Giancarlo Neri.
- Deck chair dream project for Royal Park. Commissioned by Royal Park.
- “Capturing the diversity of London”, the launch of the latest Easy Share-one camera for Kodak. Commissioned by Kodak.
