= Miano (surname) =

- Language: Various languages of Italy, Kikuyu

Origin
- Region of origin: Southern Italy, Kenya

Miano is a surname. It is a southern Italian surname, which originated both as a shortened form of given names such as Emiliano or Damiano, as well as a toponymic surname from various settlements including Miano in Naples, Miano in Parma, Miano in Teramo, Miane in Veneto, and Mian in Belluno. It is also a Kikuyu surname, from the word mĩano "a small gourd used by a mũrogi to hold divining stones". In Italy, 899 families bore the surname Miano, with slightly less than half located in Sardinia. The 2010 United States census found 1,643 people with the surname Miano, making it the 17,239th-most-common name in the country. This represented an increase from 1,531 (17,101st-most-common) in the 2000 census. In both censuses, roughly nine-tenths of the bearers of the surname identified as non-Hispanic white.

Notable people with the surname include:

- Laura Miano (born 1959), Italian sprinter
- Léonora Miano (born 1973), Cameroonian writer
- Mike Miano (born 1973), American football player
- Rebecca Miano (born 1966), Kenyan lawyer
- Rich Miano (born 1962), American football player
- Robert Miano (born 1942), American actor
- Sarah Emily Miano (born 1974), American writer
