= West Chester Golden Rams =

West Chester University of Pennsylvania sports teams

- University: West Chester University
- Nickname: Golden Rams
- NCAA: Division II
- Conference: Pennsylvania State Athletic Conference (PSAC)
- President: Christopher M. Fiorentino
- Athletic director: Terry Beattie
- Location: West Chester, Pennsylvania
- Varsity teams: 23 (9 men's, 14 women's)
- Football stadium: John A. Farrell Stadium
- Basketball arena: Hollinger Field House
- Baseball stadium: Serpico Stadium
- Soccer stadium: Rockwell Field
- Colors: Purple and Gold
- Mascot: Rammy
- Marching band: Golden Rams Marching Band
- Fight song: The RAM Fight Song
- Website: wcupagoldenrams.com
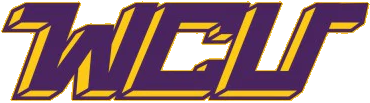

The West Chester Golden Rams represent West Chester University, which is located in West Chester, Pennsylvania, in intercollegiate sports. They compete in the Pennsylvania State Athletic Conference (PSAC) in NCAA Division II.

The university currently fields 23 varsity Division II men's and women's teams.

The men's basketball team is coached by Damien Blair and won its first NCAA Division II Tournament game in 2018. In 2019–20, the team was ranked eighth and began the season on a 13-game win streak.

The Men's soccer team is coached by Michael Benn, who has been with the Golden Rams for 10 years. He has led them to the NCAA Division II Tournament 4 times, one trip seeing them go to the National final and the PSAC conference tournament 7 times as of 2021.

== Facilities ==
- John A. Farrell Stadium (Football/Outdoor Track & Field)
- Hollinger Field House (Men's & Women's Basketball/Volleyball/Men's & Women's Indoor Track & Field/Men's & Women's Diving)
- Serpico Stadium (Baseball)
- Rockwell Field (Men's & Women's Soccer)
- Vonnie Gros Field (Field Hockey & Lacrosse)

== Varsity athletic teams ==
Men's

- Baseball
- Basketball
- Cross-Country
- Football
- Golf
- Soccer
- Swimming & Diving
- Tennis
- Track & Field

Women's

- Basketball
- Cheerleading
- Cross-Country
- Field Hockey
- Golf
- Gymnastics
- Lacrosse
- Rugby
- Soccer
- Softball
- Swimming & Diving
- Tennis
- Track & Field
- Volleyball

== National championships ==
The West Chester University Golden Rams have won a total of 14 team national championships.

=== NCAA national team championships ===
Association	Division	Sport	Year	Opponent	Score
NCAA	Pre-Division (1)	Men's Soccer (1)	1961	Saint Louis	2–0
NCAA	Division II (7)	Baseball (2)	2012	Delta State	9–0
NCAA	Division II (7)	Baseball (2)	2017	UC San Diego	5–2
NCAA	Division II (7)	Field Hockey (3)	2011	UMass Lowell	2–1
NCAA	Division II (7)	Field Hockey (3)	2012	UMass Lowell	5–0
NCAA	Division II (7)	Field Hockey (3)	2019	Saint Anselm	2–1
NCAA	Division II (7)	Women's Lacrosse (2)	2002	Stonehill	11–6
NCAA	Division II (7)	Women's Lacrosse (2)	2008	C.W. Post	13–6

=== AIAW/DGWS national team championships ===
Prior to the NCAA sanctioned women's sports, West Chester University's women's teams competed for national championships under the Association for Intercollegiate Athletics for Women (AIAW) and its predecessors, the Division for Girls' and Women's Sports (DGWS) and the Commission on Intercollegiate Athletics for Women (CIAW).

Association	Division	Sport	Year	Opponent	Score
AIAW	-	Women's Basketball	1969	Western Carolina	65–39
AIAW	-	Field Hockey	1975	Ursinus	2–1 (ps)
AIAW	-	Field Hockey	1976	Ursinus	2–0
AIAW	-	Field Hockey	1977	Ursinus	1–0
AIAW	-	Field Hockey	1978	Delaware	3–2
DGWS	-	Women's Swimming & Diving	1972	-	-

== Notable athletes ==
- Geno Auriemma (B.A. 1981) – University of Connecticut women's basketball head coach and member of both the Naismith Memorial Basketball Hall of Fame and the Women's Basketball Hall of Fame
- Dana Linn Bailey — former starting defender for West Chester University's women's soccer team, current IFBB professional bodybuilder and fitness and figure competitor (physique category), 2013 winner of Joe Weider's Olympia
- Damien Blair (1991–1995) — Collegiate men's basketball coach
- Darwin Breaux — Football, golf, and wrestling coach
- Ken Campbell – Former professional football player
- Michael Costa (Master's 1981) — Former college football coach
- Dan DePalma – Former professional football player
- Tony DiMidio – Former professional football player and coach
- Gertrude Dunn – Professional shortstop in the All-American Girls Professional Baseball League, which was made famous by the 1992 film A League Of Their Own
- John Edelman – Former MLB pitcher
- Timothy Ferkler (B.A. 1986) – Quarterback of 1984 National Championship team
- Steve Gilbert (American football) — Former collegiate American football player and coach
- Jack Gregory (American football coach) (1947) – Former collegiate American football coach and athletic director
- Kaitlin Hatch — Former field hockey player, 2021 recipient of the NCAA's Today's Top 10 Award
- Kevin Higgins (1973–1976) — College football and former professional football coach, currently both Chief of Staff and Pass Game Specialist at Appalachian State
- Joe Iacone (1960–1962) – Former football player
- Kevin Ingram – former professional football player
- Pat Kelly – Major League Baseball Player - Second Baseman for the New York Yankees
- John Mabry – 14-year MLB career
- Don Peters – former United States women's national artistic gymnastics team head coach
- Glenn Robinson (1967) — Former collegiate basketball coach, all-time wins leader in Division III men's basketball history with over 900 career victories
- Cathy Rush (B.S. 1968, M.Ed. 1972) – Former Immaculata University women's basketball head coach
- Joe Senser (1979) – Former NFL tight end, Minnesota Vikings
- Al-Hajj Shabazz (2011–2015) – Former NFL cornerback
- Bill Sharpe — triple jump competitor: 3-time Olympian, gold medalist at the 1963 Pan American Games, first place at the 1956 NCAA Track and Field Championships
- Karen Shelton (B.S. 1979) – Olympic medalist field hockey player and coach, three-time winner of the Honda Sports Award for the nation's best field hockey player
- Bill Shockley – Former professional football player
- Marty Stern (B.S. 1959) — 5-time NCAA Division I cross-country team national championship coach
- Nancy Stevens (1972–1975) — former collegiate field hockey coach, winningest collegiate field hockey coach of all time, two-time field hockey national champion coach
- Ralph Tamm (B.S. 1988) – Former NFL offensive guard
- Cindy Timchal — prolific national-champion collegiate women's lacrosse coach, member of the National Lacrosse Hall of Fame
- Juah Toe — Rugby player and coach, 2021 recipient of the NCAA's Today's Top 10 Award, consultant at IMG Academy
- Marian Washington (1970) – Former University of Kansas women's basketball head coach
- Mike Washington – 2008 Philadelphia Sports Writers Association "Outstanding Amateur Athlete"
- Chuck Weber – Former professional football player
- Ed Weichers — boxer, 1973 winner of the 190-pound championship for West Chester University, 19-time national collegiate boxing championship coach with the United States Air Force Academy
- Joey Wendle – Major League Baseball All-Star for the Tampa Bay Rays
- Don Williams (1963) – Center forward on the 1961 National Championship soccer team, three-time All-American
- Christina Wilson — former West Chester University basketball player, current chef and reality television personality
- Lee Woodall (1993) – Former NFL linebacker, San Francisco 49ers
- Jerry Yeagley (1961) – Coached Indiana University to five NCAA Soccer Championships

== See also ==
- Lacrosse in Pennsylvania
