= Damiano (given name) =

Damiano is a masculine Italian given name. Notable people with the name include:

- Damiano Cunego (born 1981), Italian road bicycle racer
- Damiano Damiani (born 1922), Italian screenwriter, film director, and actor
- Damiano David (born 1999), Italian singer song-writer and Eurovision winner
- Damiano Ferronetti (born 1984), Italian footballer
- Damiano Longhi (born 1966), Italian footballer
- Damiano Lugon (fl. 1970s–80s), Italian luger
- Damiano Mazza (artist) (16th century), Italian Renaissance artist
- Damiano Pippi (born 1971), Italian volleyball player and Olympian
- Damiano Tommasi (born 1974), Italian footballer
- Damiano Valgolio (born 1981), German lawyer and politician
- Damiano Vannucci (born 1977), San Marinese footballer
- Damiano Zenoni (born 1977), Italian footballer

Fictional characters

- Damiano, of R. A. MacAvoy's eponymous trilogy of novels

== See also ==
- Damiano (surname)
- Damiano (disambiguation)
- San Damiano (disambiguation)
