= National Society of Arts and Letters =

American non-profit organization

The National Society of Arts and Letters (known by its abbreviation NSAL) is an American non-profit group founded in 1944 as a women's organization to assist promising young artists through arts competitions, scholarships and other career opportunities. Men were later admitted to the organization, and have been an important and enriching addition.

== National Career Awards Competition ==
The National Career Awards Competition, organized by the NSAL is held each year in one of the following categories: visual arts, dance, drama, literature, music or musical theater. Participants in the National Career Awards Competition compete at the local chapter level for a series of monetary awards. First-place winners of the Local Chapter Competitions are sent to the NSAL National Competition, which is held each spring during the Society's annual meeting. Participants in the National Competition compete for a first place award of $15,000, and a series of other awards that can total another $10,000 or more.

The competitions are designed to offer exposure for young artists who want to be heard and seen by professional critics, managers, producers, teachers, the media, and patrons of the arts.

During its history, the competitions organized by the NSAL have benefitted Oscar-winning actress and dancer Shirley MacLaine and international opera star Jessye Norman among others. In 1998, non-citizens were permitted full membership privileges, thereby extending a more inviting, inclusive image to the organization.

All competitions are adjudicated by nationally recognized men and women in the arts. A master class is conducted by judges for the National Career Awards Competitions. Opportunities for one-on-one sessions and individual critiques are also encouraged.

== History ==
Begun by a group of civic-minded women who wanted to encourage young talent in the arts, the National Society of Arts and Letters determined from its inception that the best way to accomplish that goal was to sponsor competitions and offer scholarships in the categories of art, music and literature.

On October 21, 1944, they met at the home of the future first National President, Mollie Davis Nicholson, to found a group that specified it was non-partisan, non-political and non-profit-making. The Chevy Chase, Maryland Chapter was organized that year and became the Washington, D.C. Chapter on March 31, 1945, with Dorothy Nicholson Bates Stabell as its first president and founder.

A second chapter, the Chicago Chapter, was started by Francesca Falk Miller Nielsen, also in October 1944. In 1945, both chapters awarded scholarships: one in piano, three in voice (Washington) and one in pipe organ (Chicago).

On June 30, 1945, the first national conference of the National Society of Arts and Letters was held in Chicago. By this time, eight chapters had been formed: Washington, D.C., Chicago, Florida, Colorado, North Dakota, California, Texas and Kentucky. The bylaws provided membership to women qualified in the arts who were U.S. citizens. Artist member Emma W. Slack designed the insignia. Young artists were to be encouraged by receipt of donor gifts, chapter prizes, scholarships and exhibitions of their work or talent arranged by a chapter.

By 1946 four more chapters had started: Arkansas, Indiana, Ohio and New Jersey. A convention was held in Washington, D.C., between April 15–16 of that year, at the Mayflower Hotel in Washington, D.C. American First Lady Bess Truman, initiated the festivities with a reception at the White House.

As growth continued, Francesca Falk Miller Nielsen, the second National President, introduced and edited the newsletter. It was planned to issue it three times a year. A Certificate of Incorporation, was issued July 29, 1949 and tax-exempt status, was recorded November 7, 1949. By 1949 both dance and drama categories had been added to the competitions. By 1951, 25 chapters had been started.

In October 1994 members gathered together for a gala celebration of the Societies' 50th anniversary. The Central Illinois Chapter hosted the 60th Anniversary celebration in 2005 with performances by former contestants from 1959 to 2002. There was also a video featuring Dorothy Nicholson Stabell, daughter of one of the founders.

Today there are 20 NSAL Chapters in 17 states.

== Master classes ==
Part of the National competitions are the master classes conducted by judges in each art category. One-on-one sessions are also offered and encouraging critiques of each contestant are provided by the judges.

The National Society of Arts and Letters classifies the arts into six different categories: Art, Dance, Drama, Literature, Music and Musical Theatre; various sub-categories exist within each category. The annual National Competitions rotate among these six categories with the particular sub-category selected by the membership.

Master classes have been conducted in all the arts categories beginning in 2000. They have been conducted for NSAL by their judges and guest teachers including:

- Larry Leichman (co-owner of Arbor Books), literature
- Joel Revzen, Nathan Gunn and Gayletha Nichols, singing
- Robert and Louise McCall, art
- Brian Palmer, assistant professor of dance and Chair of the Division of Theatre and Dance at Jacksonville University, dance
- Terence Knapp, acting and theater
- Mark Hoebee, associate director of Paper Mill Playhouse, theater
- George Pinney co-creator of Blast!
- Jane Alderman
- Karen Azenberg, choreographer, dance
- Marek Cholewa, dance
- Lucine Amara of the Metropolitan Opera, music
- Sarah Caldwell Dramatic Soprano, Maestra, opera
- Alfonso Montecino, concert pianist, music
- Lori Belilove, modern dance
- Cynthia Bringle, pottery
- Professor Josip Novakovich, writing.

== Awards ==
Since the first national competition in 1951, NSAL has presented more than 4,000 awards to young artists. Chapter competitions are usually held in various artistic categories including the one special category specified for the National Competition for that year; only the first-place winners from the chapter competitions in this category advance to the National Competition.

Early on in the history of NSAL, the Nicholson/Nielsen Trust Fund was established to provide permanent support for awards to be given annually to ranking finalists in the National Career Award Competition. The principal of the Fund remains intact while the income is used to provide awards each year in one of the six rotating art categories which NSAL highlights in its National Competition.

Individuals and corporations may also endow a named award by contributing to the Fund. Current awards available from tax-exempt gifts to this Fund totaling $10,000 or more include:

NSAL First Place Award of $10,000 or more is in memory of Mollie Davis Nicholson and Francesca Falk Miller Nielson, founders of the Society. The Estelle Campbell Award is presented to the second-place winner. The Mary Peery Fife Memorial Award is given in the category of Dance. The Catherine A. M. Cavanaugh Award is given in the Literature Category. Other awards include the Dorothy and Bruce Strong Award and the Mollie Davis Nicholson Award

A second important activity of NSAL is the annual Winston Scholarship Program for visual artists and vocalists. Each year, scholarships totaling $18,000 – $20,000 are awarded to artists in these fields who are sixteen to twenty-two years of age. Supported by an endowment from Shirley Rabb Winston, these scholarships are used for special study in the recipient's field.

Notable recipients of NSAL awards have included Malcolm Frager (pianist), Shirley MacLaine (actor), Jessye Norman (opera singer; winner of a NSAL contest), Menahem Pressler (Gold Medal of Merit from the National Society of Arts and Letters), George Balanchine (1980 Gold Medal of Merit recipient
