= Damien (disambiguation) =

Damien is a given name and a surname.

Damien may also refer to:

== Plays and TV ==
- Damien (play), by Aldyth Morris
- "Damien" (South Park episode), the tenth episode of the first season of South Park
- Damien (TV series), an American television series based on The Omen

== Schools ==
- Damien High School, a private Catholic all-boys high school in California
- Damien Memorial School, a private Catholic all-boys school in Honolulu, Hawaii

== Wrestlers ==
- Leonardo Carrera, a professional wrestler who went by the name Damien
- Damien Demento (born 1958), stage name of American professional wrestler Phillip Theis
- Damien, the first of professional wrestler Jake "The Snake" Roberts' three snakes

== Other ==
- Tropical Cyclone Damien, a tropical cyclone

== See also ==
- Damian (disambiguation)
