= San Damian =

San Damian may refer to:

- San Damián Airport, airstrip of Vichuquén commune in the Maule Region of Chile
- San Damian District, district of the Huarochirí Province in Peru
- San Damián Texoloc, town and its surrounding municipality in the Mexican state of Tlaxcala
- Isla San Damian, island in the Gulf of California east of the Baja California Peninsula.

== See also ==
- Damian (disambiguation)
- San Damiano (disambiguation)
- Saints Cosmas and Damian
