= Damiano (surname) =

Damiano is a surname with Greek and Italian roots. Notable people with the surname include:

- Angelo Damiano (born 1938), Italian racing cyclist and olympic champion
- Cesare Damiano (born 1948), Italian politician
- Christian Damiano (born 1950), French football coach
- Diane Damiano, American biomedical scientist and physical therapist
- Gerard Damiano (1928–2008), American director of pornographic films
- Luca Damiano (born 1946), Italian film director
- Pedro Damiano (1480–1544), Portuguese chess player for whom the opening moves called Damiano Defense is named
- Jennifer Damiano (born 1991), American actress and singer

Fictional people:

- Dante Damiano, fictional characters on the American soap The Bold and the Beautiful
- Dino Damiano, son of Dante Damiano

== See also ==
- Damiano (given name)
- Damiano (disambiguation)
