= Friedrichshain-Kreuzberg 4 =

State electoral district of Germany

- Electoral district for the Berlin House of Representatives
- Friedrichshain-Kreuzberg 4 in 2026
- District: Friedrichshain-Kreuzberg
- Electorate: 35,793 (2026)

Current electoral district
- Party: Left
- Member: Damiano Valgolio

Friedrichshain-Kreuzberg 4 is an electoral constituency (German: Wahlkreis) represented in the House of Representatives of Berlin. It elects one member via first-past-the-post voting.

== Geography ==
The constituency comprises the areas of Barnimkiez, Friedenstraße, Richard-Sorge-Viertel, West Richard-Sorge-Str./Fritz-Schiff-Weg and North Kochhannstr., Andreasviertel, Weberwiese, and Wriezener Bahnhof within the borough of Friedrichshain-Kreuzberg.

There were 35,793 eligible voters in 2026.

== Members ==
Election	Member	Party	%
1999	Martina Michels	PDS	48.3
2001	Martina Michels	PDS	49.7
2006	Martina Michels	Left	36.0
2011	Susanne Kiltschun	SPD	30.1
2016	Steffen Zillich	Left	28.2
2021	Damiano Valgolio	Left	24.7
2023	Damiano Valgolio	Left	24.7
2026	Damiano Valgolio	Left	39.1

== Election results ==
=== 2026 election ===
State election (2026): Friedrichshain-Kreuzberg 4
Notes:	Blue background denotes the winner of the electorate vote. Pink background denotes a candidate elected from their party list. Yellow background denotes an electorate win by a list member, or other incumbent. A ✓ or ✗ denotes status of any incumbent, win or lose respectively.						
Party	Candidate	Votes	%	±%	Party votes	%	±%
Left	✓ Damiano Valgolio	10,474	39.1	▲15.2	10,643	39.4	▲18.2
Greens	Antje Kapek	5,240	19.5	▼5.0	4,333	16.0	▼8.1
CDU	Marita Fabeck	2,921	10.9	▼5.8	3,035	11.2	▼5.5
AfD	Frank Scheermesser	2,789	10.4	▲3.8	2,823	10.4	▲3.9
SPD	Thomas Giebel	2,481	9.3	▼8.5	2,632	9.7	▼7.0
BSW	Faruh Tursunov	1,007	3.8		1,320	4.9	
Volt	Dennis Brüsch	769	2.9		754	2.8	▲1.3
FDP	Arlett Weckowski	545	2.0	▼1.4	535	2.0	▼1.6
Tierschutzpartei					427	1.6	▼0.9
PARTEI	Jens Glatzer	397	1.5	▼1.4	272	1.0	▼1.1
Independent	Jan Mihm	185	0.7				
PdF					103	0.4	
DKP					58	0.2	▼0.1
ÖDP					32	0.1	Steady
du.					26	0.1	▼0.3
Bergpartei, die ÜberPartei					17	0.1	▼0.1
SGP					10	0.0	Steady
Informal votes		465			253		
Total valid votes		26,808			27,020		
Turnout		27,273	76.2	▲11.5			
Left hold	Majority	5,234	19.6	▲17.2			

=== 2023 repeat election ===
Changes denoted below for the 2023 election are compared to the 2016 election, as the 2021 election was declared invalid.

State election (2023): Friedrichshain-Kreuzberg 4
Notes:	Blue background denotes the winner of the electorate vote. Pink background denotes a candidate elected from their party list. Yellow background denotes an electorate win by a list member, or other incumbent. A ✓ or ✗ denotes status of any incumbent, win or lose respectively.						
Party	Candidate	Votes	%	±%	Party votes	%	±%
Left	Damiano Valgolio	4,388	24.7	▼1.9	3,817	21.5	▼6.0
Greens	Monika Herrmann	3,955	22.3	▼0.4	3,985	22.4	▲3.5
CDU	Marita Fabeck	3,208	18.1	▲8.7	3,232	18.2	▲9.1
SPD	Viola Mattathil-Reuther	3,199	18.0	▼2.1	3,043	17.1	▼2.3
AfD	Dieter Böhm	1,222	6.9	▼3.6	1,222	6.9	▼3.7
FDP	Marlene Heihsel	616	3.5	▼0.2	642	3.6	▼0.5
Tierschutzpartei	Laura Sophie Scholl	555	3.1		414	2.3	▲0.9
PARTEI	Jan-Marcel Bundels	471	2.7	▼1.0	336	1.9	▼1.4
Volt					258	1.5	
dieBasis	Holger Olschewski	145	0.8		86	0.5	
Pirates					84	0.5	▼2.1
Klimaliste					79	0.4	
Team Todenhöfer					70	0.4	
DKP					68	0.4	▼0.1
The Grays					65	0.4	
Mieterpartei					64	0.4	
Gray Panthers					57	0.3	▼0.4
du.					42	0.2	
Verjüngungsforschung					39	0.2	▼0.1
FW					33	0.2	
Humanists					31	0.2	
Bergpartei, die ÜberPartei					22	0.1	▼0.2
Bildet Berlin!					22	0.1	
SGP					21	0.1	Steady
ÖDP					19	0.1	▼0.1
The Pinks/Alliance 21					14	0.1	
NPD					13	0.1	▼0.1
BüSo					9	0.1	Steady
LKR					4	0.0	▼0.1
Informal votes		128			101		
Total valid votes		17,759			17,791		
Turnout		17,902	64.2	▼7.3			
Left hold	Majority	433	2.4				

=== 2021 election (annulled) ===
The election in 2021 was annulled and rerun in 2023.

State election (2021): Friedrichshain-Kreuzberg 4
Notes:	Blue background denotes the winner of the electorate vote. Pink background denotes a candidate elected from their party list. Yellow background denotes an electorate win by a list member, or other incumbent. A ✓ or ✗ denotes status of any incumbent, win or lose respectively.						
Party	Candidate	Votes	%	±%	Party votes	%	±%
Left	Damiano Valgolio	5,326	24.7	▼1.8	5,504	25.3	▼2.1
Greens	Monika Herrmann	5,115	23.8	▲1.0	4,725	21.7	▲2.8
SPD	Viola Mattathil-Reuther	4,531	21.0	▲1.0	3,967	18.2	▼1.2
CDU	Marita Fabeck	2,257	10.5	▲1.1	2,246	10.3	▲1.3
AfD	Dieter Böhm	1,252	5.8	▼4.7	1,258	5.8	▼4.8
FDP	Marlene Heihsel	1,235	5.7	▲2.1	1,249	5.7	▲1.6
Tierschutzpartei	Laura Sophie Scholl	744	3.5		477	2.2	▲0.8
PARTEI	Jan-Marcel Bundels	723	3.4	▼0.3	559	2.6	▼0.7
Volt					296	1.4	
dieBasis	Holger Olschewski	349	1.6		250	1.2	
Klimaliste					141	0.6	
Pirates					121	0.6	▼2.0
Team Todenhöfer					116	0.5	
The Grays					108	0.5	
FW					98	0.5	
Gray Panthers					84	0.4	▼0.3
APT					81	0.4	
Mieterpartei					71	0.3	
DKP					66	0.3	▼0.2
Humanists					59	0.3	
du.					58	0.3	
Verjüngungsforschung					57	0.3	▼0.1
Bergpartei, die ÜberPartei					46	0.2	▼0.2
ÖDP					33	0.2	▼0.1
Bildet Berlin!					29	0.1	
NPD					13	0.1	▼0.1
LKR					11	0.1	▼0.1
The Pinks/Alliance 21					10	0.0	
BüSo					3	0.0	Steady
SGP					3	0.0	▼0.1
Informal votes		238			161		
Total valid votes		21,532			21,739		
Turnout		21,931	77.7	▲6.2			
Left hold	Majority	211	0.9				

== See also ==
- Politics of Berlin
- House of Representatives of Berlin
