= Terence Knapp =

English actor (1932–2019)

Terence Richard Knapp (14 February 1932 – 12 August 2019) was an English actor, director, educator, and author. He was an emeritus professor of theatre at the University of Hawaii at Manoa, a Churchill Fellow and a Royal Academy of Dramatic Art associate.

== Youth and early career ==
Knapp was born in Hackney, London, England, the firstborn and only son of seven children of Capt. Richard Henry Knapp, RAMC and Alice Catherine (née Carey Keegan) Knapp.

The family was evacuated from London during World War II, first to an abandoned coal mine village in Wales and then to live with relatives in Crumlin, a suburb of Dublin. Knapp took a scholarship examination at the age of eleven and won a free place at Parmiter's School, an all-male Anglican grammar school. At age 14, he was cast as Lady Macbeth. His headmaster sent for his parents and told them that their son was talented and should audition for the Royal Academy of Dramatic Art (RADA). The Governors of Parmiters paid the audition fee.

On a scholarship from the London County Council, he was given a place at the Preparatory Academy for a year, until he was of age to be admitted to RADA. He was reassessed and formally admitted to RADA.

At the age of 18, he was conscripted for National Service, and trained in the Royal Air Force.

== Early career ==
In 1953, after three years in the RAF, he returned to RADA and was awarded the Academy Medal in the Annual Showing, also the sought-after prize of a year's engagement at the doyen of British Repertory Theatres, the Liverpool Playhouse. After four years of widely varied roles in three-weekly repertory in Lancashire, where he also made the acquaintance of Brian Epstein, he returned to London, where he earned a high reputation in both BBC and ITV television productions (when all transmissions were live), films and theatre. In 1962, he was invited by his idol, Sir Laurence Olivier, (whom he had seen perform on stage in roles such as Oedipus, Sir Peter Teazle and Hotspur) to be a founding member of the Chichester Festival and, one year later, an Inaugural Player of the National Theatre of Great Britain, under Olivier's direction, at the renowned Old Vic Theatre, which culminated in 1965 with Knapp's takeover of Olivier's star role as Tattle in William Congreve's Love For Love at the Scala Theatre prior to the now legendary visit to both Moscow and Berlin in Othello, Hobson's Choice, and Love For Love.

He was invited by John Neville, then artistic director of the Nottingham Playhouse, to tour West Africa for the British Council, along with a company including Judi Dench, who played Viola in Twelfth Night to Knapp's Feste. The company performed in Nigeria, Ghana and Sierra Leone for three months, after which Knapp found an opportunity to travel in Africa and Europe, where at Easter he had an audience with Pope John XXIII in Rome.

In 1966, after four years with Olivier, he was again invited by Neville to tour for the British Council, this time in Southeast Asia including Malaysia, Brunei, Sarawak, Singapore, Hong Kong and the Philippines, where the company performed under the patronage of Imelda Marcos in her new Performing Arts Center of Manila. Knapp then visited Japan of his own accord, where for four and one-half months, he worked as a consultant with the Kumo Theatre Company of Tokyo on the world premiere of The Golden Land, a play about the persecution of Christian missionaries and their converts in the early 17th century Nippon, by Endo Shusaku, touring throughout southern Japan with the company by local train with communal accommodations in small inns and hot spring spas.

In the summer of 1966, he was summoned back to England to join John Neville's Nottingham Playhouse company, spending two years with Neville and a brilliant young American associate director, Michael Rudman, playing a succession of leading roles, including Oberon, Tony Lumpkin, and Octavius in both Julius Caesar and Antony And Cleopatra, as well as Rodrigo to the Othello of Robert Ryan and John Neville's Iago.

In the summer of 1968, having just played H. G. Wells in Boots with Strawberry Jam (a musical about George Bernard Shaw by Benny Green and John Dankworth) starring Neville and Cleo Laine at the Nottingham Playhouse, Knapp was invited by the director Wendy Toye to play the title role as Mr. Buff in a new comic libretto by Robert Morley of Mozart's one-act opera The Impresario commissioned for the Bath Festival 1968 and conducted (as Monsieur Baton) by Sir Yehudi Menuhin whose wife, the distinguished ballerina Diana Gould, played the cloakroom lady.

Later in that year, sponsored by Olivier, he received a Churchill Fellowship in the Performance Arts of Japan and was off to Tokyo for nine months, with a Berlitz crash course in Japanese and generous introductions to star actors, choreographers and scholars for the study of Kabuki, Noh and, in particular, with the legendary "Charlie Chaplin" of Kyogen, Nomura Manzo. He was to return to Japan many times over the next twenty-five years to direct a score of Japanese language productions, mostly of Shakespeare, often in partnership with Yamazaki Tsutomu, and where he introduced to Tokyo audiences, in a trio of roles, Watanabe Ken.

In 1970 for the City of London Summer Music Festival Knapp performed the premiere of Alexander Goehr's Shadow Play Two and Father Christmas in Burtwhistle's Down by the Greenwood Side.

== "Hawaii's World Class Actor" ==
In Tokyo, Knapp met Kabuki scholar, Earle Ernst, the founding Chairman of the Department of Theatre and Dance at the University of Hawaii at Manoa's Kennedy Theatre. In 1970, he was invited by Ernst to go to Hawaii as a Visiting Professor to create a Performance and Production program, focusing particularly on the plays of Shakespeare and other European "classical" playwrights, as well as distinguished American authors.

In 1976, Knapp directed himself in the titular role in Aldyth Morris' Damien, a one-man show about Father Damien. Damien was ultimately broadcast nationally on PBS and won the following awards: George Peabody, Ohio State, Christopher awards for author and director, Corporation for Public Broadcasting Honorable Mention for Drama, and the National Association of Educational Broadcasters Award for Art Directing. In addition, he was recognized by the Hawai’i State Legislature as Hawai’i's Adopted World Class Actor. for this role.

In 2001, the Hawaii Shakespeare Festival was dedicated to Knapp in perpetuity.

In his last years he continued to work in Honolulu as a mentor, a song and poetry recitalist, and an occasional performer on stage, screen and television.

== Selected stage, screen and television roles ==
Knapp was a member of the ensemble performance on the occasion of the seventieth birthday of Sir Noël Coward, in the presence of HRH Princess Margaret at the Theatre Royal in Drury Lane in 1970. In 1972, he performed in Beyond the Fringe under the auspices of US Army Special Services. He created a Hawaiian Monarchy version of Mozart's Così fan tutte for the Hawai’i Opera Theatre. He adapted Gounoud's Faust for young audiences and was performer/narrator in Verdi's Otello with the Hawai’i Opera Theatre

He appeared at the Kennedy Center in Washington, D.C., in the role of Abbot Seigen in The Scarlet Princess of Edo by Namboku IV and Dr. James Brandon. He is perhaps best known for his many performances as Father Damien, the leper priest of Moloka’i, at the Kennedy Theatre at UH Manoa, at Kalaupapa Settlement, Moloka’i, Hawai’i, at Sophia University in Tokyo, at Manoa Valley Theatre, in a gala performance at Honolulu Hale (Honolulu City Hall), at the Historiche Damiaanstoer in Tremeloo, Belgium (Damien's birthplace) and in the Peabody and Ohio State award-winning television production.

Knapp appeared with the Honolulu Symphony as narrator and recitalist for such productions as Schumann's Manfred, Honegger's Joan at the Stake, Schoenberg's Survivor from Warsaw, Prokofiev's Peter and the Wolf and many Shakespeare-inspired compositions by Mendelssohn, Tchaikovsky and others.

Other roles include Henry Higgins in Pygmalion, the title role in The Miser, and King Lear in Carol Sorgenfrei's Cordelia Victorious, at Kennedy Theatre; Fagin in Oliver!, King Arthur in Camelot, Archie Rice (the Olivier role) in The Entertainer, Henry Higgins in My Fair Lady and Gallimard in M. Butterfly, all at Diamond Head Theatre, Honolulu, as well as Noël Coward in Noel and Gertie, Salieri in Amadeus and The chairman in The Mystery of Edwin Drood at Manoa Valley Theatre. One-man shows include Captain Cook, RN by Aldyth Morris in Hawaii and Einstein Talks Like a Regular Guy (Dowd) at the University of Cape Town and the Pretoria Technikon, South Africa, performing the Einstein piece also in Hawai’i. From 1971 to 2005, Knapp was the featured performer in annual Shakespeare Birthday Shows at Kennedy Theatre and from 1993 to 2005 performed annually at (Robert) Burns Night for the Caledonian Society of Hawai’i.

Television performances, in addition to Damien, include several roles in the Hawaii Five-O, Magnum, P.I. and Big Hawaii series. From 1977 to 1982 he regularly hosted Spectrum–Hawaii, interviewing celebrities and artists on Hawaii Public Television.

== Awards and honors ==
- Royal Society of Poetry, Certificate of Merit (1947)
- Royal Academy of Dramatic Art Medal, Diploma of Distinction, Comic Mime Prize, Arliss Prose Prize, Liverpool Playhouse Scholarship and offer of H.M. Tennant One-Year Contract (1954)
- Recipient of Churchill Medal, presented by Queen Elizabeth (1969)
- University of Hawai’i Board of Regents Medal for Excellence in Teaching as a Senior Professor (1977)
- Nominated by Honolulu Star-Bulletin newspaper, as a State Cultural Treasure (1978)
- Recipient, State of Hawai’i House of Representatives Resolution: "Hawaii's Own Adopted World-Class Actor", his Damien Public Broadcasting system telefilm received Peabody and Ohio State University Awards (1979);
- Recipient, University of Hawai’i Clopton Award for Distinguished Community Service(1980)
- Numerous Hawai’i State Theatre Council Po’okela (Excellence) Awards including Director of Romeo and Juliet, Kennedy Theatre; Lead Actor and Director, Amadeus and Best Performance in a Musical for Noel and Gertie (1986); Director, A Midsummer Night's Dream (1987)
- Recipient, Certificate of Appreciation from Friends of the Hawai’i Opera Theatre for twenty years of lectures on opera production, lives of composers, etc. (1990);
- Recipient of Presentation Clock in appreciation of twenty-five years of lectures for Friends of the Hawai’i Opera Theatre, Recipient, Scot of the Year Award, Caledonian Society of Hawai’i; Laureate: National Society of Arts and Letters (Hawai’i Chapter) (1995).

== Publications ==
- The Training of the Young Actor in Japan, Shimbun Darts, 1974
- Dialogue article with Donald Keene on the problems of directing in the Japanese language, Shjingekidan Kumo, 1974
- "The Kawasugi Journal", Onstage Studies, Number Six, published by the Colorado Shakespeare Festival, 1982
- "Genesis of Damien", Hawai’i Catholic Herald, 1996
- Hawaii's Adopted World Class Actor (with Hilda Wane Ornitz), Xlibris Corporation, Copyright 2000.

== Additional Source ==
- Knapp, Terence with Hilda Wane Ornitz Hawaii's Adopted World Class Actor (2000)
