= Jonathan Meades =

British writer (born 1947)

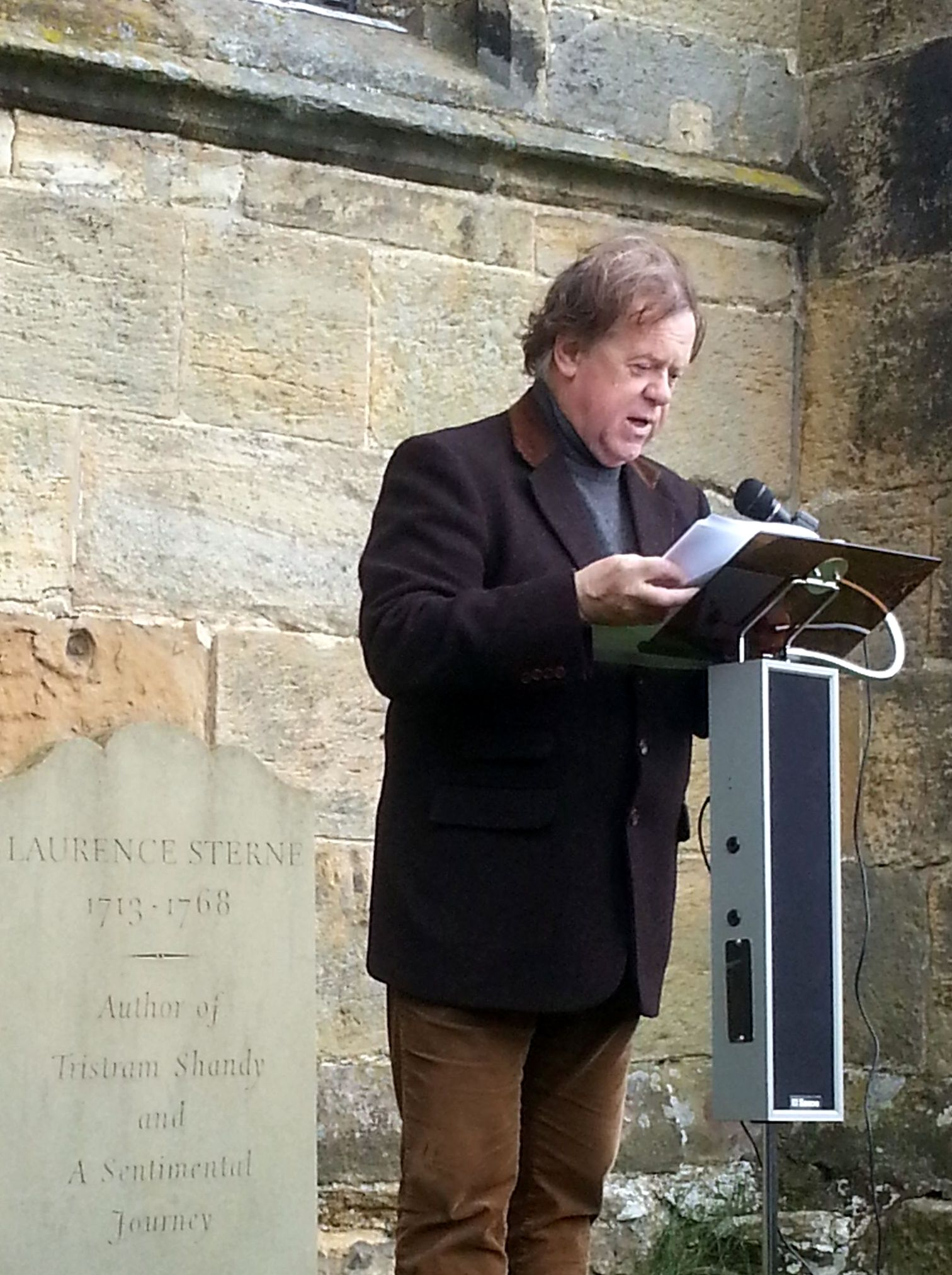
- Meades reading at the grave of Laurence Sterne, Coxwold, 2012
- Born: Jonathan Turner Meades; 21 January 1947 (age 79); Salisbury, Wiltshire, England
- Education: Salisbury Cathedral School; King's College, Taunton; University of Bordeaux
- Alma mater: Royal Academy of Dramatic Art
- Occupations: Journalist; Critic; Author; TV film-maker & performer; Essayist; Photographer
- Spouses: Sally Brown (1980–1986) Frances Bentley (m. 1988; div. 1997) Colette Forder (m. 2003)
- Children: 4 daughters
- Website: Jonathan Meades; MeadesShrine

Jonathan Turner Meades (born 21 January 1947) is an English writer and film-maker. His work spans journalism, fiction, essays, memoir and over fifty television films, mainly for the BBC. His most recent novel, Empty Wigs, was published in February 2025.

He has described himself as a "cardinal of atheism" and is both an Honorary Associate of the National Secular Society and a Patron of Humanists UK.

Meades was elected a Fellow of the Royal Society of Literature in 2019.

== Early life and education ==
Jonathan Meades was born in Salisbury, Wiltshire, the only child of John William Meades, a biscuit company sales rep, and Margery Agnes Meades (née Hogg), a primary school teacher. The family lived in an "unbelievably cramped" terraced, thatched cottage in the East Harnham area of the city. Meades was educated until the age of 13 at the nearby Salisbury Cathedral School, within Salisbury Cathedral Close.

He discovered a fascination for place and the built environment whilst accompanying his father on sales trips during school holidays; he would be left unattended and free to explore while the elder Meades conducted his business with the grocer. This later developed into a full-blown passion for architecture following a visit to Edwin Lutyens' Marsh Court on a school cricket trip at the age of 13. He also developed an early love of France on the frequent trips which his family took there, made possible by his Francophile mother's father, who worked for Southern Railway, the company which ran the Saint-Malo and Le Havre ferries.

In 1960 he was sent as a boarder to King's College, Taunton, which he has described as "a dim, backward, muscular Christian boot camp". He later "walked out" of the school and was sent instead to a crammer in London, where he lodged with the painter Vivien White, daughter of Augustus John.

After a year at the University of Bordeaux and unsure of what to do next, he decided to become an actor after a chance meeting with Charles Collingwood and trained at the Royal Academy of Dramatic Art (RADA) from 1966 to 1969. His contemporaries there included Robert Lindsay, David Bradley, Stephanie Beacham, Michael Kitchen and Richard Beckinsale. He later described it as a "Sandhurst for chorus boys" where students were "martially drilled", teaching them the value of discipline, craft and technique.

Although he ultimately decided against joining the acting profession, the training which he received would prove essential in his later television career, as would his extra-curricular interest in French New Wave cinema, in particular the work of Jean-Pierre Melville and Alain Robbe-Grillet. His regular Sunday pastime of exploring the capital with his Pevsner Architectural Guide would also benefit him later. On leaving RADA, he was told by the Principal, Hugh Cruttwell, that he might as well abandon acting until he reached middle age, at which point he might become an interesting character actor. When the two met again decades later, after Meades had established himself on television, Cruttwell joked that he had not realised that the character would be called "Jonathan Meades".

== Writing ==
=== Journalism ===
Following a period as a freelance copywriter, Meades began writing for the literary magazine Books & Bookmen in 1971, setting him on a career as a journalist and critic. In 1973 he reviewed a V&A exhibition on Victorian architecture for the magazine, igniting a passion for the style and prompting him to explore even more of London than he had to date. Using the unlimited travel afforded by Red Rover bus passes, he rode on random buses for 20 minutes and then got off, no matter where he was.

After leaving Books and Bookmen in 1975 he wrote for the sex education magazine Curious and joined the staff of Time Out, then became The Observer's TV critic in 1977. This led to the publication of his first book, This Is Their Life, an A to Z of TV star biographies with an introduction by Mike Yarwood. He moved to Architects' Journal in 1979 and around this time worked on another book, The Illustrated Atlas of the World's Great Buildings, with Philip Bagenal.

In 1981 he became the editor of Richard Branson's short-lived listings magazine Event, then from 1982 was the features editor of Tatler. It was here that he first had the opportunity to write about food, filling in as restaurant critic after Julian Barnes resigned, using the pseudonym "John Beaver". He was also invited to contribute to the bi-monthly restaurant magazine À la Carte around this time. In 1986 he was offered the job of restaurant critic at The Times, replacing comedy writer Stan Hey. Meades was a great success in this position, taking the job more seriously than his predecessor. He won Best Food Journalist at the 1986, 1990, 1996 and 1999 Glenfiddich Awards.

Despite his success, he often tired of the repetitive nature of the job and threatened to leave several times. The paper responded by increasing his salary. He finally quit around 2000, having been pronounced morbidly obese by his doctor: he had put on around five pounds per year, or one ounce per meal, during his tenure. He then managed to lose a third of his body weight over the course of the following twelve months, using a strict diet of protein and citrus. He remained with The Times as a columnist until 2005.

In the years since, he has done less journalism but has contributed essays and reviews to numerous publications including the New Statesman, The Independent, The Guardian, The Spectator, The Daily Telegraph and The Times Literary Supplement.

=== Books and other writing ===
In 1982, Harpers & Queen published three short stories which Meades had written about "rural lowlife". These, along with four more, were collected in 1984 as Filthy English, his first volume of fiction. Andrew Billen of the London Evening Standard later described them as "bucolic horror stories". A few more stories appeared in his first anthology of journalism and essays, 1989's Peter Knows What Dick Likes, the title of which is a reference to the supposed superiority of male-on-male fellatio.

He contributed to the screenplay of the 1992 French-Italian adventure film L'Atlantide, directed by Bob Swaim, and also wrote three unproduced screenplays in the 1980s and the 1990s: Millie's Problem (1985), The Side I Dressed On (1987) and The Brute's Price (1996).

His first novel, Pompey, was published in 1993. A dark, epic family saga set in the titular city of Portsmouth, it was widely praised and favourably compared to Sterne, Scarfe, Steadman, Nabokov and Joyce, amongst other "great stylists". On its 2013 reissue, Matthew Adams wrote in The Independent, "Where his first collection of stories, Filthy English, achieved the distinction of covering in aggressively vivid prose the disciplines of murder, addiction, incest and bestial pornography, Pompey exhibits an even greater concentration of his aptitude for squalor ... by the end of the opening two pages, which must rank among the most startling affirmations of omniscience in 20th-century literature, the reader has met with an arresting injunction: 'After using this book please wash your hands.'"

A second novel, The Fowler Family Business, followed in 2002. A tale of suburban sexual deceit in the funeral trade, it was described by the London Evening Standard as "hilarious and very black". An anthology of his food journalism, Incest and Morris Dancing: A Gastronomic Revolution, was published in the same year. In a 2010 interview with The Arts Desk, he discussed his work on a third novel.

An anthology of journalism, essays and TV scripts on the built environment, Museum Without Walls, was published by the crowdfunded imprint Unbound in 2012.

Meades' memoir of his childhood in the 1950s and early 1960s, An Encyclopaedia of Myself, was published in May 2014. It was long-listed for that year's Samuel Johnson Prize and won Best Memoir in the Spear's Book Awards 2014. Roger Lewis of the Financial Times said of the work that "If this book is thought of less as a memoir than as a symphonic poem about post-war England and Englishness – well, then it is a masterpiece.".

In 2015, the publisher and record label Test Centre released a spoken word vinyl album by Meades entitled Pedigree Mongrel, consisting of readings from Pompey, Museum Without Walls, An Encyclopaedia of Myself and unpublished fiction, combined with soundscapes created by Mordant Music. The sleeve of the album featured photography by Meades, including an abstract self-portrait on the front cover. Also in 2015, Meades, along with Laura Noble, contributed essays to Robert Clayton's photographic collection Estate, which documented life on the soon-to-be-demolished Lion Farm housing estate in Oldbury, West Midlands in 1990.

A book of "borrowed" recipes, The Plagiarist in the Kitchen: A Lifetime's Culinary Thefts, was published by Unbound in 2017. According to Meades, it is "devoted to the idea that you shouldn't try and invent anything in the kitchen, just rely on what has already been done ... I hate the idea of experimental cookery, but I like the idea of experimental literature.".

Isle of Rust, a collaboration with the photographer Alex Boyd featuring text based on Meades' script for his 2009 film about Lewis and Harris, was published by Luath Press in 2019.

An anthology of uncollected writing from 1988 to 2020 entitled Pedro and Ricky Come Again, described as "the best of three decades of Jonathan Meades" and the sequel to Peter Knows What Dick Likes, was published by Unbound in March 2021.

Meades' long-awaited third novel, Empty Wigs, was published by Unbound in February 2025 and received critical acclaim.

(See full bibliography)

== Television ==
Meades' first foray into television was in 1985: a short film on the art and architecture of Barcelona for the BBC Two arts magazine programme Saturday Review. His first big project was the 1987 six-part Channel 4 architectural documentary series The Victorian House. This contained many stylistic similarities to his other work, but the producer of the series, John Marshall, received the sole writing credit and it was not a happy experience for Meades. He would be credited as the sole author of all his subsequent work.

His next series was Abroad in Britain, broadcast on BBC Two in 1990. It featured five irreverent, "slightly bonkers" films which explored unusual and neglected aspects of the built environment: informal plotland dwellings along the Severn Valley, nautical culture around the Solent and architectural forms associated with utopianism, bohemians and the military. Each episode was introduced by Meades as being "devoted to the proposition that the exotic begins at home". The series was influenced by the work of architectural critic Ian Nairn and French New Wave film director Alain Robbe-Grillet and it cemented Meades' uniquely incongruous on-screen persona: dark glasses, dark suits, inscrutable, didactic delivery and dense, mordant language peppered with gags and surreal interludes. Rachel Cooke of The Guardian later described his TV persona as "pugnacious, sardonic and seemingly super-confident", while noting the RADA training and that it was "not the real Jonathan Meades, who is an altogether more diffident and shy character ... except when drunk". The series spawned four sequels: Further Abroad (1994), Even Further Abroad (1997), Abroad Again in Britain (2005) and Abroad Again (2007), along with several other series and films, the majority of which have been archived on the website MeadesShrine.

Preferring to be thought of as a performer rather than as a presenter, Meades has described his style as "heavy entertainment"; "staged essays" which seek to combine "lecture hall" and "music hall", Geoffrey Hill and Benny Hill.

The 1998 film Heart By-Pass looked affectionately at Birmingham; particularly at how its architecture, transport system and ethnic mix have changed since the 1960s. It featured the music of many of the city's best-known 1960s and 1970s rock bands such as The Moody Blues, The Move, Traffic, Black Sabbath and ELO.

He made two films on the architectural historian Nikolaus Pevsner. The first, in 1998, was the Worcestershire episode of the series Travels with Pevsner, in which noted writers followed his guide books on particular counties. The second, in 2001, was a biography entitled Pevsner Revisited.

Meades made two films which aired earlier in 2001, Victoria Died in 1901 and is Still Alive Today examined the other-worldly legacy of Victorian architecture and culture a hundred years on, set to a soundtrack of late 1960s psychedelic rock by artists such as The Velvet Underground, The Kinks and Pink Floyd, while suRREAL FILM (or tvSSFBM EHKL, the letters of the title moved forwards then backwards) sought to expound on surrealism in a manner befitting the subject, and reflected on, inter alia, the fact that Meades had recently lost a considerable amount of weight. Both films featured the comic actor Christopher Biggins, notably as Queen Victoria and were the first of Meades' films to be directed by Francis Hanly, who would go on to be his main collaborator, directing and shooting virtually all of his films from 2008.

A three-part series on food, Meades Eats, aired on BBC Four in 2003, again featuring Biggins and Hanly. The episodes dealt with fast food, the notion of a gastronomic revolution in the UK and with the ever-increasing influence of immigrant cuisines.

The 2008 two-part BBC Four film Jonathan Meades: Magnetic North celebrated the culture of Northern Europe, examining why the North suffers in the British popular imagination in comparison with the South. Meades travelled from the slag heaps of northern France to Belgian cities, the red-light district of Hamburg, Gdańsk, the Baltic States and finally Helsinki, musing on the architecture, food and art of the places he visited. Writing in The Daily Telegraph, James Walton praised the programme as "Sparkling, thought-provoking, constantly challenging the accepted view, Meades seemed at times inspired, at others deranged. The only thing he never was, thank heaven, was obvious.".

A 9-DVD box set collecting all of his BBC work to date was planned for release in April 2008, but was reduced to a 3-disc anthology due to the expense of licensing the music used in the programmes. Much of the carefully chosen popular music used in the original edits was replaced by library music, and the more music-dependent films such as Surreal Film, Victoria Died in 1901 and Heart By-Pass were not included.

In 2009, Meades toured Scotland in a three-part BBC Four series entitled Jonathan Meades: Off Kilter. He visited Aberdeen, Lewis and Harris (the 'Isle of Rust') and the less-renowned footballing towns of south-west Fife, Clackmannanshire and Falkirk, guided by his foul-mouthed 'ScotNav'.

In 2012, BBC Four screened Jonathan Meades on France, a series in which he explored his "second country". The first episode, Fragments of an Arbitrary Encyclopaedia, focused on the Lorraine region, using a miscellany of words beginning with the letter V. The second episode, A Biased Anthology of Parisian Peripheries, focused on Frenchness and its major traits. The series concluded with Just a Few Debts France Owes to America.

The 2013 film The Joy of Essex examined that county's little-known history of utopian communities.

A two-part series on Brutalist architecture, Bunkers, Brutalism and Bloodymindedness: Concrete Poetry, aired in 2014.

In a 2017 interview with The Guardian, Meades quoted his director, Francis Hanly, on how their production budgets had declined over the years: "We used to be a convoy, now we are a Smart car". In a 2008 interview with The Independent, he indicated that the blame for this lay mostly with former BBC Two controller Jane Root.

Jonathan Meades on Jargon aired on BBC Four in May 2018. The BBC Four website described it as a "provocative television essay" which "dissects politics, the law, football commentary, business, the arts, tabloid-speak and management consultancy to show how jargon is used to cover up, confuse and generally keep us in the dark". The Guardian described it as "blisteringly brutal, clever and hilarious", while The Times also declared Meades to be "on blistering form".

Over a period of 25 years, Meades has written and presented four films on the architectural legacy of 20th-century European dictators, the latest of which, Franco Building with Jonathan Meades, looking at Franco's Spain, aired in August 2019. The previous instalments were Jerry Building (Nazi Germany, 1994), Joe Building (Joseph Stalin's Soviet Union, 2006) and Ben Building (Benito Mussolini's Italy, 2016).

(See full filmography)

== Photography ==
Meades entered the world of photography with the 2013 collection Pidgin Snaps. Published by Unbound as a "boxette" of 100 postcards, it featured mostly abstract digital work. It was followed in April 2016 by an exhibition entitled "Ape Forgets Medication: Treyfs and Artknacks" at the Londonewcastle Project in Shoreditch, London. A second exhibition, "After Medication: Random Treyfs and Artknacks", was held in October 2017 at 108 Fine Art, Harrogate.

== Personal life ==
Meades has been married three times and has four daughters from his first two marriages. In 1980 he married Sally Brown, director of the British Theatre Association, and the couple had twins. His second wife was Frances Bentley, managing editor of Vogue, whom he married in 1988. They had two daughters and divorced in 1997. In 2003 he married his girlfriend Colette Forder, a colleague from The Times. In around 2007, the couple sold their penthouse flat on Tyers Gate, off Bermondsey Street, Southwark, where they had lived for 10 years, and moved to a converted mill near Bordeaux. Discovering that they found country life boring, they then moved to Marseille in around 2011, where they live in Le Corbusier's Unité d'habitation apartment block.

During his time at RADA, he became friends with the painter Duggie Fields, whose flatmate was the former Pink Floyd singer, songwriter and guitarist Syd Barrett. He was also friendly with Aubrey "Po" Powell, co-founder of the graphic design company Hipgnosis, most famous for their Pink Floyd album covers. He has described himself as "a hanger-on to the hangers-on" around the band and has admitted to taking LSD three times, describing it as "the only remotely interesting drug".

Meades was called "the best amateur chef in the world" by Marco Pierre White. He taught himself to cook as a young man using Mastering the Art of French Cooking (1961, 1970), by Simone Beck, Louisette Bertholle and Julia Child.

He won the first ever episode of the BBC's Celebrity Mastermind, broadcast in December 2002. His specialist subject was English Architecture, 1850–2002.

In the autumn of 2016, he was rushed to hospital and underwent five hours of cardiac surgery. Earlier in the year he had suffered from pleurisy and an embolism.

== Bibliography ==
- This Is Their Life (1979, Salamander, ISBN 0-86101-045-0; biographies of TV personalities)
- The Illustrated Atlas of the World's Great Buildings (1980, Salamander, ISBN 0-86101-059-0; co-author with Philip Bagenal)
- Filthy English (1984, Jonathan Cape, ISBN 0-224-02145-1; collection of short fiction)
- English Extremists: The Architecture of Campbell Zogolovitch Wilkinson Gough (1988, Fourth Estate, ISBN 0-947795-68-5; co-author with Deyan Sudjic and Peter Cook)
- Peter Knows What Dick Likes (1989, Paladin, ISBN 0-586-08890-3; anthology of journalism, essays and short fiction)
- Pompey (1993, Vintage, ISBN 0-09-930821-5; novel)
- Incest and Morris Dancing: A Gastronomic Revolution (2002, Cassell, ISBN 0-304-35938-6; anthology of food journalism)
- The Fowler Family Business (2002, Fourth Estate, ISBN 1-85702-904-6; novel)
- Museum Without Walls (2012, Unbound, ISBN 978-1-908717-184; anthology of journalism, essays and TV scripts on the built environment)
- Pidgin Snaps: A Boxette of 100 Postcards (2013, Unbound, ISBN 978-1783520176; boxed collection of photographs)
- An Encyclopaedia of Myself (2014, Fourth Estate, ISBN 978-1-85702-905-5; childhood memoir)
- Estate (2015, Stay Free, ISBN 978-0993128400; collaboration with photographer Robert Clayton and writer Laura Noble on the Lion Farm housing estate, Oldbury, West Midlands)
- The Plagiarist in the Kitchen: A Lifetime's Culinary Thefts (2017, Unbound, ISBN 978-1783522408; collection of recipes)
- Isle of Rust (2019, Luath Press, ISBN 978-1913025007; collaboration with photographer Alex Boyd on Lewis and Harris)
- Pedro and Ricky Come Again: Selected Writing 1988–2020 (2021, Unbound, ISBN 978-1783529506; anthology of uncollected journalism and essays)
- Empty Wigs (2025, Unbound, ISBN 978-1800183247; novel)

== Filmography ==
All films written and presented by Jonathan Meades, except The Victorian House, credited to John Marshall.

- Saturday Review (1985–1987, BBC Two; contributor)
- The Victorian House (1987, Channel 4; 6-part series)
- Building Sights: Marsh Court (1988, BBC Two)
- Abroad in Britain (1990, BBC Two; 5-part series)
- Further Abroad (1994, BBC Two; 5-part series)
- Jerry Building: Unholy Relics of the Third Reich (1994, BBC Two)
- One Foot in the Past: Vanbrugh in Dorset (1995, BBC Two)
- Without Walls: J'Accuse – Vegetarians (1995, Channel 4)
- Even Further Abroad (1997, BBC Two; 5-part series)
- Birmingham: Heart By-Pass (1998, BBC Two)
- Travels with Pevsner: Worcestershire (1998, BBC Two)
- Victoria Died in 1901 and is Still Alive Today (2001, BBC Two)
- tvSSFBM EHKL: suRREAL FILM (2001, BBC Knowledge)
- Pevsner Revisited (2001, BBC Knowledge)
- Meades Eats (2003, BBC Four; 3-part series)
- Abroad Again in Britain (2005, BBC Two; 5-part series)
- Joe Building: The Stalin Memorial Lecture (2006, BBC Four)
- Abroad Again (2007, BBC Two; 5-part series)
- Jonathan Meades: Magnetic North (2008, BBC Four)
- Jonathan Meades: Off Kilter (2009, BBC Four; 3-part series)
- Jonathan Meades on France (2012, BBC Four; 3-part series)
- Jonathan Meades: The Joy of Essex (2013, BBC Four)
- Bunkers, Brutalism and Bloodymindedness: Concrete Poetry (2014, BBC Four)
- Ben Building: Mussolini, Monuments, Modernism and Marble (2016, BBC Four)
- Jonathan Meades on Jargon (2018, BBC Four)
- Franco Building with Jonathan Meades (2019, BBC Four)

== Discography ==
=== DVD ===
- The Jonathan Meades Collection (2008, BBC Worldwide, 3-disc set)

=== Vinyl ===
- Pedigree Mongrel (2015, Test Centre, vinyl LP with digital download; spoken word & soundscapes)
