= Damian (surname) =

Damian is a surname. Notable people with the surname include:

- Cornel Damian (born 1960), Romanian Roman Catholic bishop
- Georgeta Damian (born 1976), Romanian rower and winner of four Olympic Gold medals
- Giovanni Pietro Damian (born 2003), known as Sangiovanni, Italian singer-songwriter
- Horia Damian (1922–2012), Romanian painter and sculptor
- Jean-Michel Damian (1947–2016), French radio journalist
- Mircea Damian (1899–1948), Romanian writer
- Michael Damian (born 1962), American singer and actor
- Pater Damiaan (1840–1889), Belgian missionary, probably named after the first martyr
- Saint Peter Damian (died 1072), Italian monk
