= Damien Blair =

American basketball coach

Current position
- Title: Head coach
- Team: West Chester University
- Conference: Pennsylvania State Athletic Conference
- Record: 223–122 (.646)

Playing career
- 1991–1995: West Chester University

Coaching career (HC unless noted)
- 1998–2008: Downingtown West High School
- 2008–present: West Chester University

Head coaching record
- Overall: 223–122 (.646)

Damien Blair (born 1972/73) is the men's head basketball coach at West Chester University.

== Early life and education ==
Blair attended The Haverford School and was coached by Mike Mersky. As a junior, he averaged 19 points per game and earned first-team All-Inter-Ac honors. He began playing for West Chester University in 1991 after being contacted by the coach and taking a visit. During his sophomore season, Blair missed a last-second shot to lose a game that, if they won, would have qualified the Golden Rams for the NCAA Division II Tournament. As a junior, he set the West Chester record for most three-pointers in a season with 125.

He averaged 21.8 points per game, and had two games scoring more than 30 points. Blair was named PSAC East player of the year in 1994 and 1995. Blair finished his career as the second-leading scorer in school history with 2,025 points. He graduated from West Chester with a degree in physical education. Blair had a brief stint playing for the Delaware Blue Bombers of the United States Basketball League and tried out for the Philadelphia 76ers in 1995. In 2001, he was inducted into the Messikomer Men's Basketball Hall of Fame at West Chester University.

== Coaching career ==
Blair began his coaching career at Downingtown West High School in 1998. He led the team to four appearances in the state playoffs. In the 2007–08 season, he led Downingtown West to its first-ever Ches-Mont League title and an appearance in the Class AAAA playoffs after defeating Coatesville High School. In July 2008, he was named the head coach at West Chester, succeeding Dick DeLaney, who retired after 21 seasons. He finished with a 173–78 record at Downingtown West.

In his first season at West Chester, Blair led the team to an 18–10 overall record including 9–5 in conference play, third in the Eastern Division and helped the team reach the quarterfinals of the PSAC tournament. Blair helped the Golden Rams reach the 2012, 2014 and 2016 PSAC Championship Games. In 2018, Blair led West Chester to its first NCAA Tournament win in program history. The 2017–18 team finished 22–7 and were led by Malik Jackson's 19.2 points per game. The following season, the team again reached the NCAA Tournament and finished 22–9, capped by a 15-game win streak. In the 2019–20 season, the Golden Rams began the season on a 13-game winning streak and were ranked eighth nationally, the highest ranking in 37 years. Ihe team finished 20–10 and was led by Australian native Robbie Heath, whose 24.6 points per game average was the highest in school history and who transferred to Division I Pepperdine after the season.

== Personal life ==
Blair is married to Carolyn, a 1997 graduate of West Chester University and former women's basketball player, and lives in Downingtown, Pennsylvania. The couple have four children: Hunter, Dylan, Autumn, and Hayden.

== Head coaching record ==
Record table
Season	Team	Overall	Conference	Standing	Postseason
West Chester Golden Rams (Pennsylvania State Athletic Conference) (2008–present)
2008–09	West Chester	18–10	9–5		
2009–10	West Chester	18–9	5–9		
2010–11	West Chester	16–10	5–9		
2011–12	West Chester	19–10	14–8		
2012–13	West Chester	20–8	17–5		
2013–14	West Chester	20–10	11–5		NCAA Division II First Round
2014–15	West Chester	16–13	14–8		
2015–16	West Chester	23–7	17–5		NCAA Division II First Round
2016–17	West Chester	14–15	11–11		
2017–18	West Chester	22–7	17–5		NCAA Division II Second Round
2018–19	West Chester	22–9	16–4		NCAA Division II First Round
2019–20	West Chester	20–10	13–9		
West Chester:		223–122 (.646)	148–83 (.641)		
Total:		223–122 (.646)			
National champion Postseason invitational champion Conference regular season champion Conference regular season and conference tournament champion Division regular season champion Division regular season and conference tournament champion Conference tournament champion
