= Fanny Maughan Vernon =

American politician

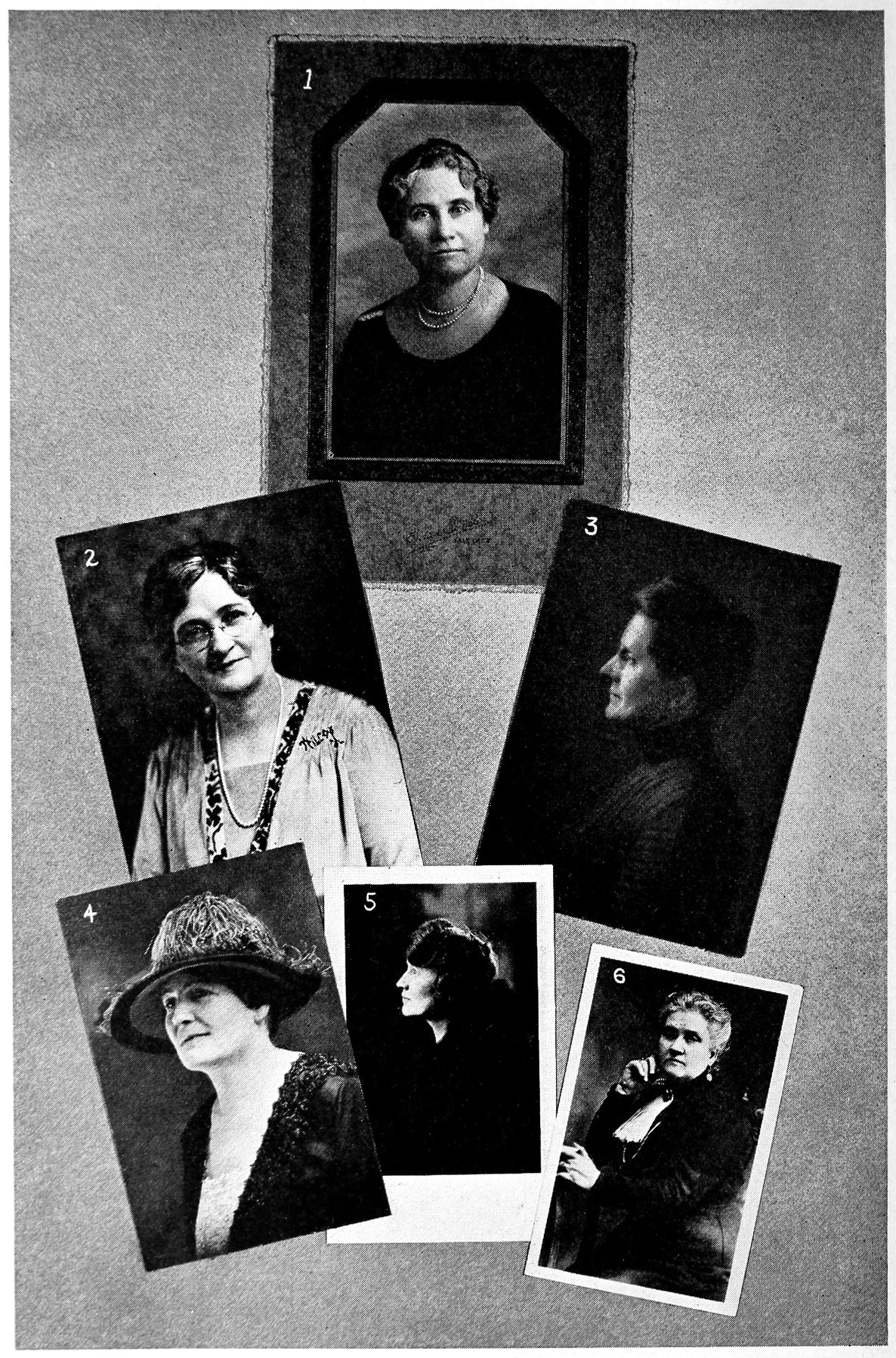
1) Alice Louise Reynolds, 2) Amy Brown Lyman, 3) Grace Raymond Hebard, 4) Fanny Maughan Vernon, 5) Ruth Moench Bell, 6) Susa Young Gates

Frances "Fanny" Maughan Vernon (November 24, 1872 - March 28, 1940) was an American educator. She was a prominent clubwoman and Democratic National committeewoman of Utah.

== Early life ==
Frances "Fanny" Maughan was born in Logan, Utah, on November 24, 1872, the daughter of Charles Weston Maughan (1844-1914) and Jane Mc Kenzie Farnes (1849-1892).

== Career ==
Fanny Maughan Vernon was a teacher of English and devoted her life to the study of Literature and the promotion of its study.

She was vice-chairman of the Logan Kindergarten Association.

She was a member of the Executive Board of the Little Theatre. She organized the Drama Clubs in various parts of the county.

She was chairman of the Legislative Committee of the Business and Professional Women's Club. She was a member of the Legislative Committee of the State Federation of Women's Clubs. She was state legislative chairman of the Business and Professional Women's Federation Clubs.

She was on the Democratic National Committeewoman of Utah.

She was president of the B. Y. Literary Club, Clio Club, A. C. Faculty Women's League.

== Personal life ==
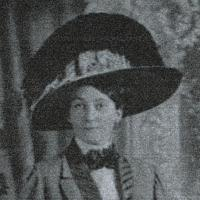
Fanny Maughan Vernon

On November 23, 1898, Fanny Maughan married Peter Weston Vernon (1873-1941), prominent real estate man, state legislator and member of the USAC board of trustees. They had six children: Lais Vernon Hales (1900-1961), Aldyth Vernon Morris (1901-1997), Weston Vernon (1903-1977), Clinton DeWitt Vernon (1907-1987), Frances Imogen Vernon (1909-2009), Marjorie Daw Vernon Smith (1911-1987).

She lived at 123 East Second St., North, Logan, Utah.

She died on March 28, 1940, and is buried with her husband at Logan City Cemetery.
