= Damien Quinn =

Damien Quinn may refer to:

- Damien Quinn (hurler) (born 1980), Irish hurler
- Damien Quinn (rugby league) (born 1981), rugby league player
