= Damien K. A. Griffith =

Barbadian politician

Damien K. A. Griffith is a Barbadian politician who served as a senator. He was a member of the Committee for Selection in 2008 and named the best debater at the University of the West Indies, Cave Hill Campus.
