= Damiano Valgolio =

German politician (born 1981)

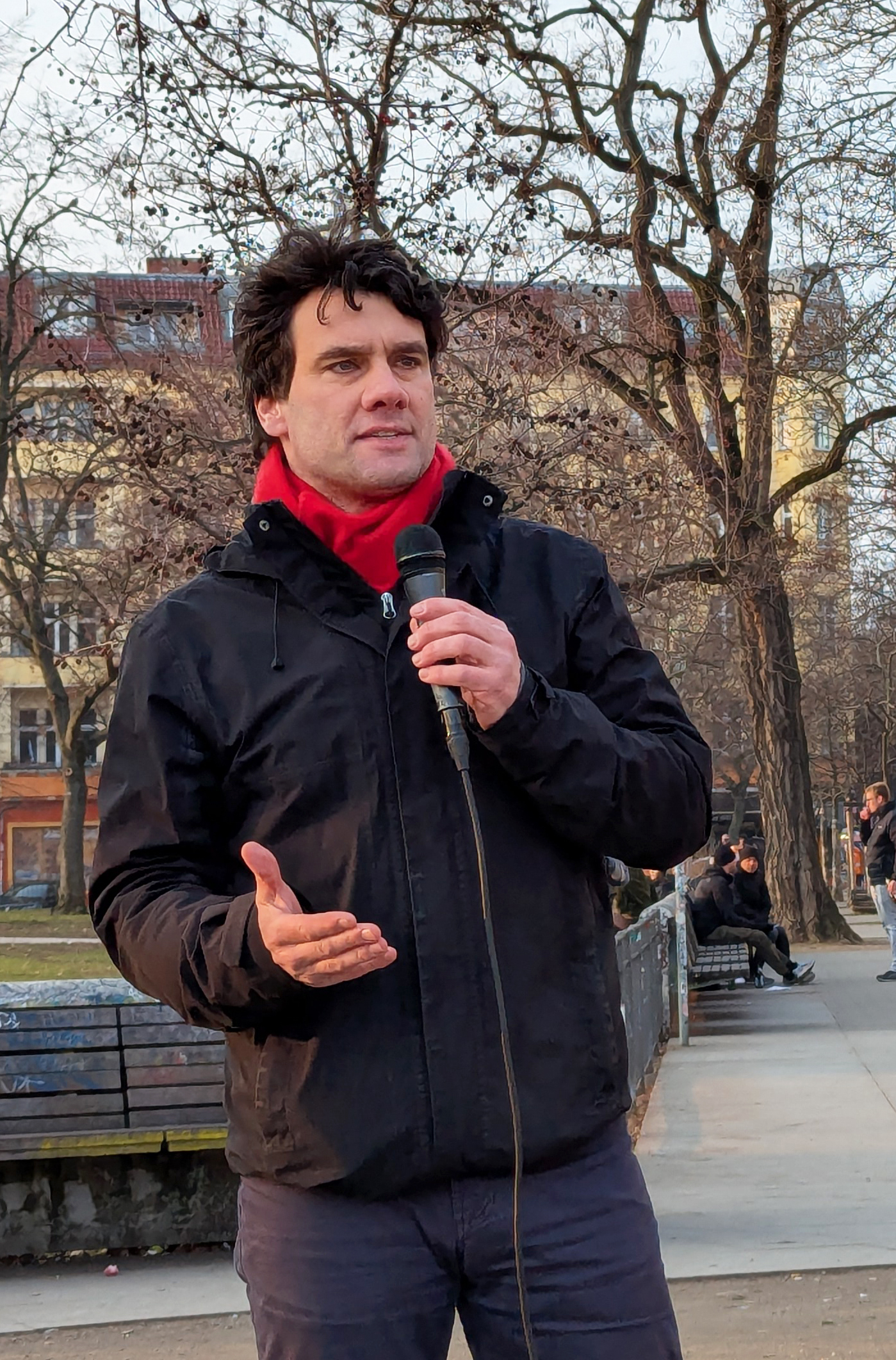
- Damiano Valgolio in 2025

Member of the Abgeordnetenhaus of Berlin
- Incumbent
- Assumed office 2021

Personal details
- Born: 1981 (age 44–45) Hanover, Germany
- Party: Die Linke
- Education: Humboldt University of Berlin

Damiano Valgolio (born 1981) is a German lawyer and politician from The Left Party (Die Linke) who has been a member of the Abgeordnetenhaus of Berlin since 2021.

== Biography ==
Damiano Valgolio studied law at Humboldt University of Berlin. He works as a lawyer specializing in labour law.

== Political career ==
Valgolio has been a member of The Left Party since 2007; previously, he was a member of the WASG. He is deputy district chairman of his party in Friedrichshain-Kreuzberg. In the 2021 Berlin state election, he won a direct mandate in the Friedrichshain-Kreuzberg 4 constituency. In the 2023 repeat election, he was able to retain his seat in the Abgeordnetenhaus of Berlin.

== See also ==
- List of members of the 19th Abgeordnetenhaus of Berlin (2021–2023)
- List of members of the 19th Abgeordnetenhaus of Berlin (2023–2026)
