= Damiano, Pella =

Greek village

Coordinates: 40°50′N 22°27′E

Damiano (Greek: Δαμιανό) is a small village outside the town of Giannitsa, in Greece's Pella regional unit. The village, of only about 4 hundred people, is famous for the agricultural regions around it, and its church of Ayios Dimitrios. The village is the birthplace of Elisavet Mystakidou, who won a silver medal in tae kwon do at the Athens 2004 Olympics.

== Demographics ==
Year	1928	1940	1951	1961	1971	1981	1991	2001	2011
population	320	642	526	563	463	470	409	;	396
