= Father Damien (disambiguation) =

Father Damien, Saint Damien of Molokai, Jozef de Veuster (1840–1889), was a Belgian missionary priest who served in a leper colony on Molokai in Hawaii.

Father Damien or Father Damian may also refer to:

- Damien Karras, fictional hero of The Exorcist
- "Father Damian", alias of Damian Abraham of Fucked Up, Canadian hardcore punk band
- Father Damian, character in Song for a Raggy Boy, 2003 film, played by Alan Devlin
- Father Damián, character in El padrecito, 1964 film, played by Ángel Garasa
- Father Damian, purported previous incarnation of Chico Xavier, Brazilian medium
- Father Damian, character in The Great Heart, 1938 short film, played by Tom Neal
- Father Damien, 1999 album by Wim Mertens

== See also ==
- Pope Damian of Alexandria
