= Damian Subdistrict =

Damian Subdistrict 大面街道
- Subdistrict
- Location in Sichuan
- Coordinates: 30°36′36″N 104°9′5″E
- Country: People's Republic of China
- Province: Sichuan
- Prefecture-level city: Chengdu
- District: Longquanyi District
- Time zone: UTC+8 (China Standard)

Damian Subdistrict (Chinese: 大面街道; pinyin: dàmiàn jiēdào) is a subdistrict in Longquanyi District, Chengdu, Sichuan province, China. As of 2020, it has sixteen neighborhoods under its administration:

- Minle Community (民乐社区)
- Donghong Community (东洪社区)
- Hongliu Community (洪柳社区)
- Yushi Community (玉石社区)
- Lingchuan Community (陵川社区)
- Longhua Community (龙华社区)
- Haorizi Community (好日子社区)
- Shida Community (师大社区)
- Long'an Community (龙安社区)
- Wuxing Community (五星社区)
- Yuelong Community (悦龙社区)
- Qingtaishan Community (青台山社区)
- Ruilong Community (瑞龙社区)
- Tian'ehu Community (天鹅湖社区)
- Wolong Community (卧龙社区)
- Fenshui Community (分水社区)

== See also ==
- List of township-level divisions of Sichuan
