= Stedelijk Museum Breda =

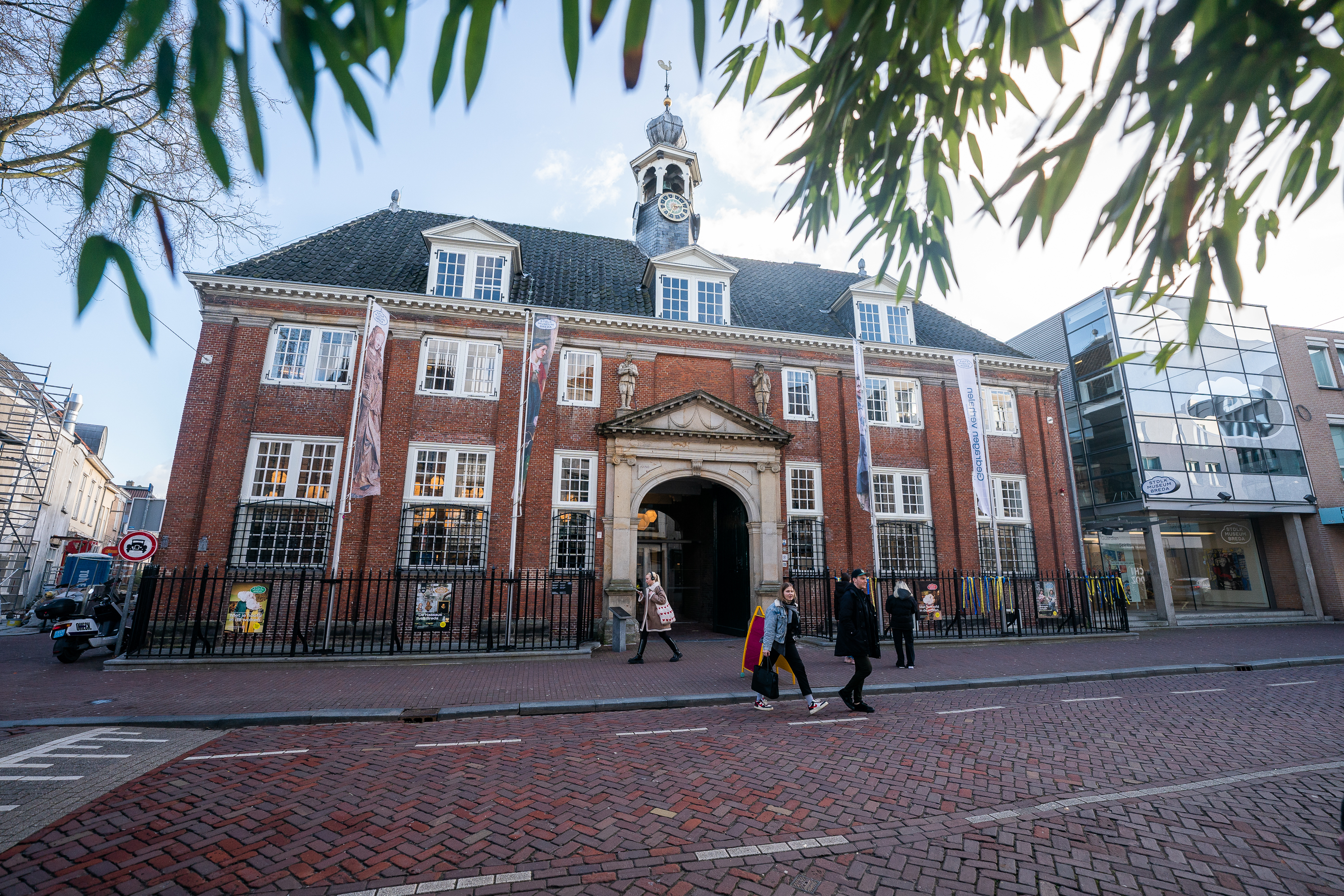

- Location in North Brabant in the Netherlands
- Established: 1 January 2008
- Location: Boschstraat 22; Breda, Netherlands
- Coordinates: 51.5896°N 4.7811°E
- Type: National museum
- Visitors: 40,000 (2012 est.)
- Website: stedelijkmuseumbreda.nl

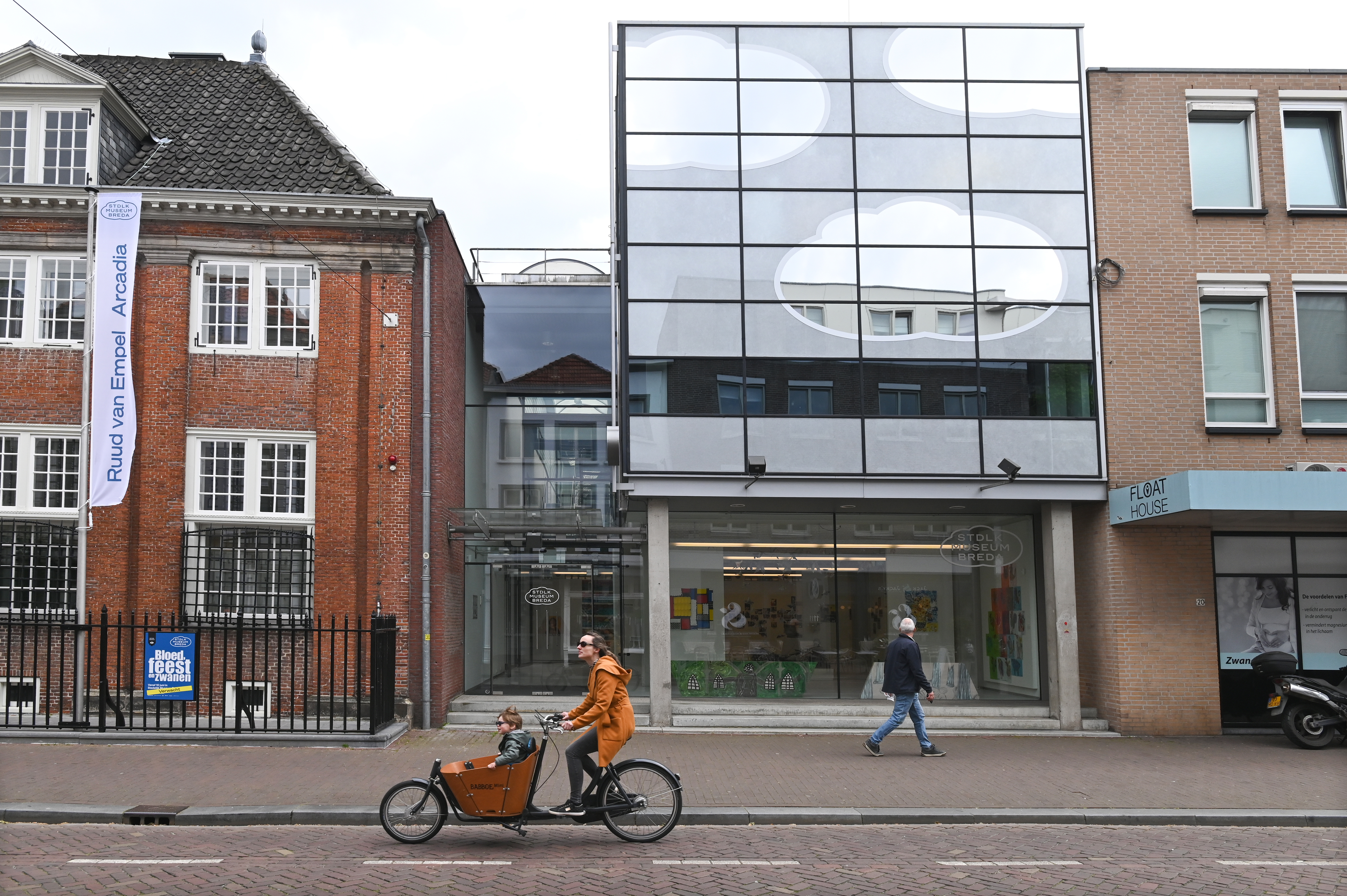

Stedelijk Museum Breda is the city museum of Breda, located in the province of North Brabant, the Netherlands. Housed in a centuries-old building once known as the Oudemannenhuis (Old Men’s House) also known as De Beyerd, a listed monument with nearly 800 years of history.

The museum explores the identity of Breda through historical exhibitions on Breda’s cultural heritage — including the influential Nassau dynasty — with contemporary visual culture. The museum was founded in 2017 through the merger of Breda's Museum and the Museum of the Image (MOTI).

== History ==
The origins of Stedelijk Museum Breda trace back to 1903, with the founding of the first municipal museum in the city. Breda’s Museum curated a broad collection related to local history; from religion and military history to industry and urban development. The museum also managed the city collection of the Municipality of Breda and the collections of the Friends of Breda's Museum.

In 2008, the design-focused Graphic Design Museum opened in the same building, later rebranded as Museum of the Image (MOTI) in 2011. MOTI explored graphic design and digital visual culture. In 2017, Breda’s Museum and MOTI merged to form Stedelijk Museum Breda.

== Architecture and Building History ==
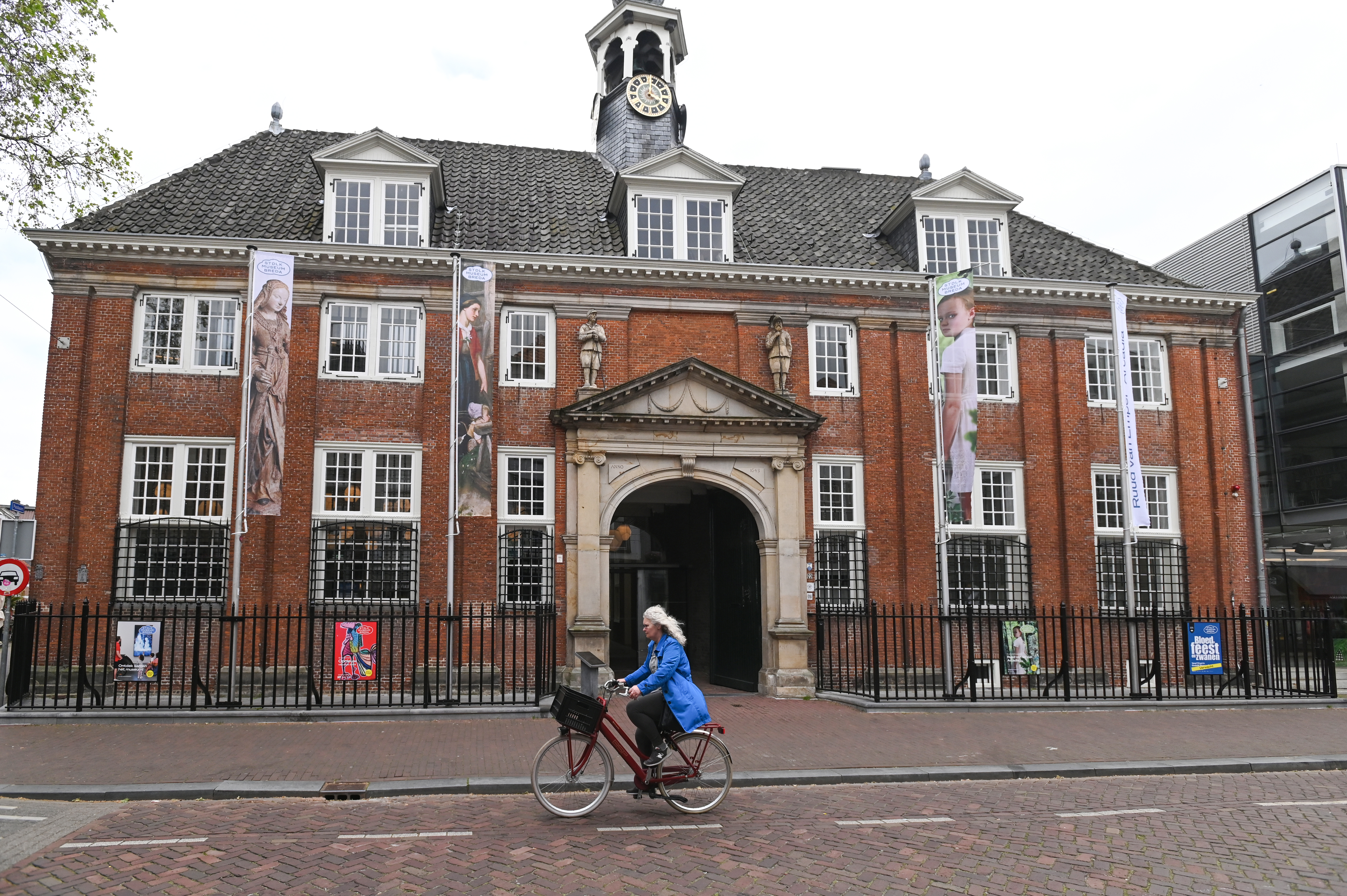

The museum is housed in a centuries-old building originally established as a Gasthuis in 1246. Over time, it was repurposed as an Old Men’s House (Oudemannenhuis), a former guest house originally established in the 13th century as a hospice for travelers and the sick. Over centuries, the building served as an old men's home before becoming the cultural center: De Beyerd. Its historic facade, created by stonemason Laureys Drijffhout in the 17th century, remains a notable feature. The building was renovated for museum use in 2017; adapted to meet 21st-century standards while preserving its historical character.

The building has been a national heritage site (rijksmonument) since 1966.

== Collections ==
Highlights :

● Portrait of Mary Stuart and her son William III by Gerard van Honthorst

● Paintings by Petrus van Schendel, including his self-portrait

● Christ and the Samaritan Woman at the City of Breda — considered the oldest known cityscape of Breda (c. 1518)

● A series of six still lifes by Jan Hendrik Frederiks (1799)

● Works by August Allebé and other 19th-century Dutch artists

== Mission and Vision ==
Stedelijk Museum Breda aims to preserve, explore, and enrich the cultural world of Breda. The museum connects local heritage to broader national and global themes through exhibitions, research, education, and collaboration.

== Permanent Exhibitions ==
Stedelijk Museum Breda hosts a permanent exhibition titled The Nassaus of Breda, which explores the historical influence of the Nassau family on the city. Through a combination of historical artifacts, artworks, and multimedia storytelling, the exhibition links the city's past with broader national events, such as the Dutch Revolt. The display is part of the museum’s broader initiative, Royal Roots, which ties local heritage to the development of the Netherlands.

== Contemporary Art and Visual Culture ==
In addition to its historical collections, the museum presents contemporary exhibitions focusing on culture and storytelling. These include solo presentations by emerging artists, thematic group shows, and works exploring the intersection of art, identity, and society. This curatorial direction reflects the museum’s roots in the former Museum of the Image (MOTI).

== Education and Outreach ==
The museum offers educational programs for schools and families, creative workshops, and public events. These include walking tours such as Explore Royal Breda, a podcast titled Forward to the Past, and family workshops for kids, linked to current exhibitions. These initiatives aim to connect local history to broader cultural and social issues.

== Royal Roots Program ==
Royal Roots is a long-term cultural initiative that explores the legacy of the Nassau family in Breda. It includes exhibitions, city-wide tours, podcasts, and partnerships with other culture institutions. The program aims to foster pride and historical awareness by connecting Breda’s local identity with national and European history.

== ANBI Status ==
Stedelijk Museum Breda holds ANBI status (Public Benefit Organisation), meaning donations are tax-deductible and the museum is exempt from gift and inheritance tax.
