= Damien Irwin =

Irish hurler and manager

Personal information
- Native name: Damien Ó hEireamhóin (Irish)
- Born: 23 May 1969 (age 57) Killeagh, County Cork, Ireland
- Occupation: Primary school principal
- Height: 6 ft 1 in (185 cm)

Sport
- Sport: Hurling
- Position: Left wing-back
Clubs
- Years: Club
- Killeagh; Imokilly
Club titles
- Cork titles: 2
College
- Years: College
- Mary Immaculate College
College titles
- Fitzgibbon titles: 0
Inter-county*
Years	County	Apps (scores)
1989-1990	Cork	2 (0-00)
Inter-county titles
- Munster titles: 1
- All-Irelands: 1
- NHL: 0
- All Stars: 0
- *Inter County team apps and scores correct as of 14:58, 7 April 2019.

Damien Irwin (born 23 May 1969) is an Irish hurling manager and former player who played for East Cork club Killeagh. He played for the Cork senior hurling team for two seasons, during which time he usually lined out as a left wing-back.

== Honours ==
Killeagh

- Cork Intermediate Hurling Championship (1): 2001
- Cork Junior Hurling Championship (1): 1995
- East Cork Junior A Hurling Championship (2): 1998, 1995

Imokilly

- Cork Senior Hurling Championship (2): 1997, 1998

Cork

- All-Ireland Senior Hurling Championship (1): 1990
- Munster Senior Hurling Championship (1): 1990
- All-Ireland Under-21 Hurling Championship (1): 1988
- Munster Under-21 Hurling Championship (1): 1988
- Munster Minor Hurling Championship (1): 1986

Sporting positions
Preceded by John Meyler	Cork Under-21 Hurling Manager; 2014-2016	Succeeded by Pat Kenneally
