= Damien Farrell =

Antiguan and Barbudan footballer

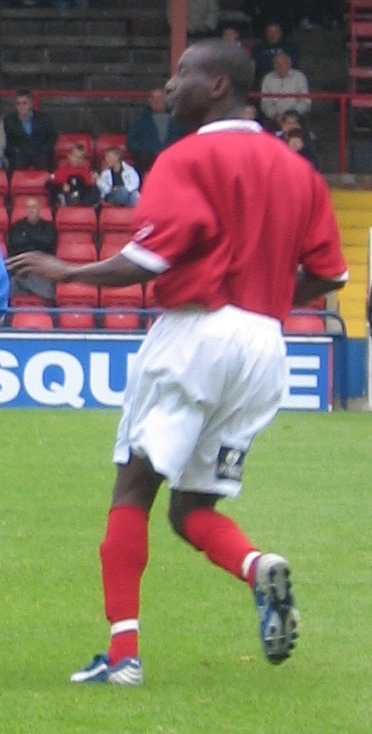
- Farrell playing for York City in 2007

Personal information
- Date of birth: 17 March 1984 (age 42)
- Place of birth: Antigua and Barbuda
- Position: Defender

Team information
- Current team: Sani Pro Fort Road

Senior career*
Years	Team	Apps	(Gls)
- Empire
- All Saints United
- Sani Pro Fort Road

International career
2006–2008	Antigua and Barbuda	15	(0)
- * Club domestic league appearances and goals

Damien Farrell (born 17 March 1984) is an Antiguan and Barbudan footballer who plays as a defender for Sani Pro Fort Road.

== Club career ==
Farrell started his career with Empire. He went on trial with AFC Bournemouth and Nottingham Forest following the end of the 2006–07 season. He also went on trial with Conference Premier club York City after he and Gayson Gregory had been recommended by Bryan Hamilton, a consultant for the Antiguan and Barbuda national team. Farrell and Gregory did not earn contracts, but York manager Billy McEwan said the two could still be brought back on trial during 2007–08. He joined All Saints United in 2008 and in November 2013 was playing for Sani Pro Fort Road.

== International career ==
Farrell is an Antigua and Barbuda international, making his debut in a friendly match against Saint Vincent and the Grenadines on 27 August 2006. He played in two FIFA World Cup qualification matches. Farrell earned 15 caps from 2006 to 2008.

== Career statistics ==
Appearances and goals by national team and year
National team	Year	Apps	Goals
Antigua and Barbuda	2006	7	0
Antigua and Barbuda	2008	8	0
Total		15	0
