= Jean-Michel Damian =

- Born: 8 September 1947; Chambéry, Savoie, France
- Died: 1 November 2016 (aged 69); Paris, France
- Education: Sciences Po
- Occupation: Journalist

Jean-Michel Damian (8 September 1947 – 1 November 2016) was a French radio and television music journalist. He hosted and produced radio programmes on France Musique from 1980 to 2009. He was the author of two books.

== Early life ==
Jean-Michel Damian was born on 8 September 1947, in Chambéry, Savoie, France.

He learned to play the piano, the harpsichord and the pipe organ as a child. He graduated from Sciences Po.

== Career ==
Damian was a radio journalist. He began his career as a music journalist on France Culture in the early 1970s. He was also a book reviewer Politique Hebdo, a radio programme on France Culture. He joined France Inter in 1975, where he was a music reviewer on Temps de vivre, hosted by Jacques Pradel, until 1977. He was the host of Espace musical, a television programme on France 3, in 1978.

Damian was a music journalist on France Musique, a French radio station, from 1980 to 2009. He became the host of L’Air du temps de la musique in 1980. He was subsequently the host and producer of Désaccord parfait, Les Imaginaires, Cordes sensibles, and Ce soir on dîne.

Damian was the author of two books, including a novel, Scène dans le bleu.

== Death ==
Damian died during the course of an operation in a Paris hospital on 1 November 2016, aged 69.

== Works ==
- Damian, Jean-Michel (1981). L'harmonie perdue. Paris: Fayard. OCLC 164786029.
- Damian, Jean-Michel (1988). Scène dans le bleu. Paris: Éditions Michel de Maule. ISBN 9782876230231. OCLC 20757248.
