= Damien Bower =

Australian rugby league footballer

Personal information
- Born: 17 June 1980 (age 45)

Playing information
- Position: Five-eighth
Club
Years	Team	Pld	T	G	FG	P
2002–03	St George Illawarra	12	0	0	0	0

Damien Bower (born 17 June 1980) is an Australian former professional rugby league footballer who played in the 2000s, he played in the National Rugby League (NRL) for the St. George Illawarra Dragons.
