= Damien Fahrenfort =

South African surfer

- Born: Damien Fahrenfort; 10 November 1986 (age 39); Cape Town, South Africa
- Occupations: Business person, professional surfer, journalist
- Known for: Business, Professional Surfing, Journalism

Damien Fahrenfort (/ˈfærənˌfɔːrt/ FARR-ən-fort; born 10 November 1986), also known as "Dooma", is a South African business person, professional surfer, web-content creator, producer and journalist born in Cape Town, South Africa.

Damien Fahrenfort was a competitor on the World Surf League qualifying series tour between 2006 and 2011. His best result as a top level professional surfer was 3rd place in the 2011 Copa Quiksilver El Salvador at Punta Roca in La Libertad, La Libertad, El Salvador.

Since retiring from full-time surf competition, he has been active with the business world and surfing-related journalism, including his surfing industry insider's blog entitled, "Doomas Rumors".

After immigrating to the United States in the mid-2010s, Fahrenfort has worked with marketing for Orange County-based Quiksilver industries, run the US division of the Australian surfing publication, Stab, and has managed the careers of some of the surfing world's top athletes.

He is also the co-founder and marketing director of Venice Beach’s "General Admission" boutique men's shop.

== Filmography ==
- 2013: Ice Cream

=== Interviews about Fahrenfort ===
- 2011 Grind TV "Cote's Cube With Damien Fahrenfort" interview by Chris Cote
- 2012 Surfing Magazine (March) "Influencing Damien Fahrenfort" by Jason Miller
- 2013 Stab Magazine "Dooma Fahrenfort Ain't Lying" by Peter Taras
- 2013 Zig Zag Magazine (March) "Dooma Fahrenfort's No BS Interview"
- 2015 Beach Grit "Wow: South African takes over Venice!" by Chas Smith
- 2015 The Hundreds "Venice Beach's Newest Menswear Boutique Bridges the City's Cultural History" by Tara Mahadevan
- 2016 Hayden Shapes (November) "An Interview with Damien "Dooma" Fahrenfort of General Admission" by Beau Flemisterb
- 2016 Oliver Grand "5 Minutes with Damien Fahrenfort of General Admission"

=== Articles/interviews written by Fahrenfort ===
- 2013 ISSUU "Kelly Slater Urban Jungle"
- 2016 Venice Ball "Q & A with VBL Founder Nick Ansom"
- 2016 Stab Magazine "Stab's picks for the 2016 World Title!"
- 2016 Stab Magazine "The Eddie Aikau: Quiksilver Big Wave Invitational"
- 2016 Stab Magazine "These Are The 12 Best Waves Ridden in 2016"
- 2016 General Admission Magazine (Dec.) "Eazy E, N.W.A and Ithaka Darin Pappas's Iconic Imagery"
