= Damien Richardson =

Damien Richardson may refer to:

- Damien Richardson (footballer) (born 1947), Irish football manager and former player
- Damien Richardson (American football) (born 1976)
- Damien Richardson (actor) (born 1969), Australian anti-vaxxer and former actor
