= Damien Valero =

French mixed media artist (born 1965)

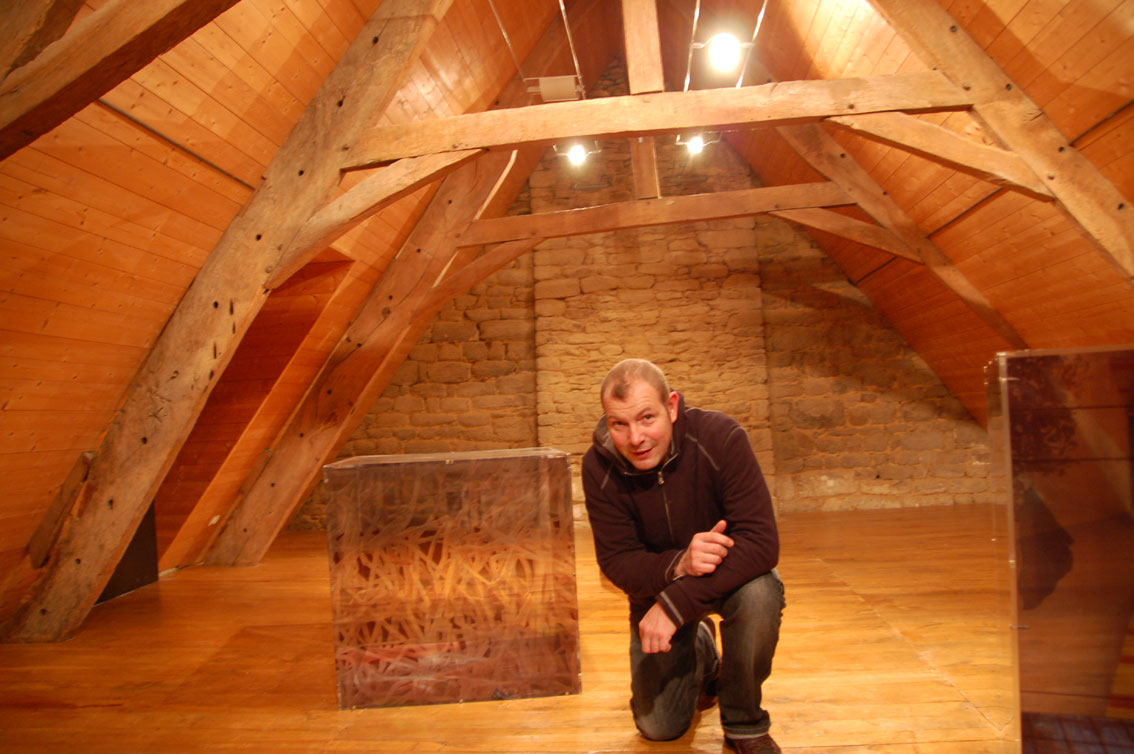
- Born: Damien Valero; 1965 (age 60–61); Paris, France
- Education: ENSAD (École nationale supérieure des arts décoratifs, Paris 1 Panthéon la Sorbonne, l'Atelier national de recherche typographique)
- Known for: Visual artist, Mixed media
- Website: https://atelierdamienvalero.com/

Damien Valero (born 1965) is a French mixed-media visual artist and professor of art and space at Georgia Tech (USA) and l'École nationale supérieure d'architecture de Paris-La Villette (France). His work is held in the National Collection of France, and he exhibits throughout Europe and abroad.

== Career ==
Damien Valero passed the entry competition at Arts déco at age 23. Once admitted, he gravitated towards the printed image. Peter Keller encouraged him to seek entry to the Atelier national de recherche typographique. There he met Jean Widmer.

Studies :

- 1995 : École nationale supérieure des arts décoratifs
- 1996 : Master's degree in Visual Arts, Paris 1 Panthéon la Sorbonne
- 1997 : Atelier national de recherche typographique
- DEA en arts plastiques et sciences de l'art, Paris 1 Panthéon

== Bibliography ==
- (in French) 2007: Catalogue, text by Lionel Dax
- (in French) 2006: Fragments et figures, text by Lionel Dax
