= San Damiano =

San Damiano is the Italian for Saint Damian. It may also refer to:

Places

- San-Damiano, a commune in the Haute-Corse department of France on the island of Corsica
- San Damiano al Colle, a commune of the Italian Province of Pavia, located among the hills of the Oltrepò Pavese
- San Damiano d'Asti, a commune of the Italian Province of Asti, located in the Alto Monferrato, on the borders with the Langhe and Roero
- San Damiano Macra, a commune of the Italian Province of Cuneo, in the Valle Maira, a valley of the Cottian Alps
- San Damiano (Brugherio), a frazione of Brugherio in the Italian Province of Monza and Brianza, Lombardy

Other

- San Damiano, Assisi, a church and monastery in the Italian region of Umbria associated with Saints Clare and Francis
- The San Damiano Cross, a large Romanesque rood cross associated with Saint Francis of Assisi which presently hangs in the Basilica of Saint Clare in Assisi
- "San Damiano (Heart and Soul)", a song by Sal Solo

== See also ==
- Damiano (disambiguation)
- San Damian (disambiguation)
