= Damien Lewis =

Damien Lewis may refer to:

- Damien Lewis (American football) (born 1997), American football player
- Damien Lewis (filmmaker) (born 1966), British author and filmmaker

== See also ==
- Damian Lewis (born 1971), English actor
