= Saint Damien =

Saint Damien may refer to:

- Saint-Damien, Quebec, a municipality in Canada
- Saint-Damien-de-Buckland, Quebec, a village in Canada
- Father Damien (1840–1889), also called Saint Damien of Molokai, a Roman Catholic priest from Belgium
- Saints Cosmas and Damian, twins and early Christian martyrs born in Arabia

See also: Pope Damian of Alexandria
