= Damion Berger =

British contemporary photographer (born 1978)

- Born: 1978
- Occupation: photographer
- Website: damionberger.com

Damion Berger is a British contemporary photographer. He works with a large-format camera. A book of his swimming-pool photographs, In the Deep End, was published in 2011.
