= Bartyla =

Bartyla is a surname. Notable people with the surname include:

- Damian Bartyla (born 1971), Polish lawyer and politician
- Henryk Bartyla (1925–2001), Polish footballer
