= Damyanov =

Damyanov (Bulgarian: Дамянов) (feminine: Damyanova) is a patronymic surname of Bulgarian origin, meaning "child of Damyan". Notable people with the surname include:

- Aleksandar Damyanov (born 1943), Bulgarian sprint canoer
- Andrey Damyanov (1813–1878), Bulgarian architect
- Borislav Damyanov (born 1998), Bulgarian footballer
- Damyan Damyanov (born 2000), Bulgarian footballer
- Georgi Damyanov (1892–1958), Bulgarian politician
- Ignat Damyanov (born 1987), Bulgarian footballer
- Svobodka Damyanova (born 1955), Bulgarian sprinter
- Velin Damyanov (born 1988), Bulgarian footballer
