= Damnjanović =

Damnjanović (literally "son of Damnjan") is a Serbian surname, predominantly born by ethnic Serbs.

It may refer to:

- Jovana Damnjanović (born 1994), Serbian footballer
- Milan Damnjanović (philosopher) (1924–1994), Serbian philosopher
- Milan Damnjanović (physicist) (born 1953), full professor specialising in Quantum mechanics and Mathematical physics
- Radomir Damnjanović Damnjan (1935–2025), Serbian-Italian painter and conceptual artist
- Sanja Damnjanović (born 1987), Serbian handballer

== See also ==
- Damjanović
- Damjanić
- Damijanić
