= Damone (given name) =

Damone is a given name of African-American usage. Notable people with the name include:

- Damone Brown (born 1979), American basketball player
- Damone Clark (born 2000), American football player
- Damone Johnson (born 1962), American football player

== See also ==
- Damon (given name)
- Damone (disambiguation)
