= Damião =

Damião is the Portuguese version of the general European name Damian, from the Latin Damianus and, in turn, from the Greek Δαμιανος Damianos which was derived from the Greek word δαμαω damao meaning "to tame". Generally a given name, it can also be a family surname.

It may refer to:

- Cosme Damião, Portuguese footballer
- Damião António Franklin, Angolan Catholic bishop
- Damião de Góis, Portuguese humanist philosopher (1502–1574)
- Damião Vaz d'Almeida, São Tomé and Príncipe politician
- Leandro Damião, Brazilian footballer
- Liberato Damião Ribeiro Pinto, Portuguese military officer and Prime Minister (1880–1949)
- Mário Hipólito Damião, Angolan footballer
- Pedro Damião, Portuguese chess master (1480–1544)
- Wellington Damião Nogueira Marinho, Brazilian footballer
- Damião Experiença, Brazilian musician

== Other ==
- Damião, municipality in Paraíba, Brazil
