= Damjanović =

Damjanović (Serbian Cyrillic: Дамјановић, pronounced [dǎmjanoʋitɕ, damjǎː-]; originally meaning "son of Damjan") is a Serbian and Croatian surname. It may refer to:

- Aleksandar Damjanović (born 1973), Bosnian basketball coach, administrator and former player
- Božidarka Kika Damjanović-Marković (1920–1996), Yugoslav Partisan commander
- Dalibor Damjanović (born 1977), Slovenian basketball coach
- Danijela Damjanović, Serb-Swedish mathematician
- Darko Damjanović (born 1977), Serb-Swiss footballer
- Dario Damjanović (born 1981), Bosnian footballer
- Dejan Damjanović (born 1981), Montenegrin footballer
- Dejan Damjanović (born 1986), Montenegrin footballer
- Dragan Damjanovic (born 1957), Swiss-Bosnian-Herzegovinian materials scientist
- Jovica Damjanović (born 1975), Serbian footballer
- Jovan Damjanović (born 1982), Serbian footballer
- Jovo Damjanović (born 1996), Montenegrin-born Qatari handball player
- Kozma Damjanović, Serbian icon painter
- Marija Damjanović (born 2000), Bosnia and Herzegovina footballer
- Mato Damjanović (1927–2011), Yugoslav chess player
- Milan Damjanović (1943–2006), Yugoslav-Serb footballer
- Milena Damjanovic, filmmaker known for her 1974 short film, Sharing the Dream, about Indigenous Australian dance workshops
- Miljan Damjanović (born 1984), Serbian politician
- Miodrag Damjanović (1893–1956), Serbian brigadier general of the Royal Yugoslav Army
- Mirko Damjanović (1937–2010), Serbian football coach
- Miroljub Damjanović (born 1950), Serbian basketball player
- Nevena Damjanović (born 1993), Serbian footballer
- Ratomir Damjanović (born 1945), Serbian radio journalist, writer and reciter
- Sanja Damjanović (born 1972), physicist and Minister of Science in the government of Montenegro
- Slavko Damjanović (born 1992), Serbian footballer
- Sreten Damjanović (born 1946), Serbian Greco-Roman wrestler
- Stipe Damjanović (born 1969), Croatian wrestler
- Stjepan Damjanović (born 1946), Croatian Slavist
- Vasilije Damjanović (1734–1792), Serbian writer, merchant, senator and municipal judge

== See also ==
- Damnjanović
- Damjanić
- Damijanić
