= Damijanić =

Damijanić (literally "little Damijan"), is a Croatian and Serbian surname.

== See also ==
- Damjanić
- Damjanović
- Damnjanović
