= De'Mon =

De'Mon is a masculine given name. Notable people with the name include:

- De'Mon Brooks (born 1992), American basketball player
- De'Mon Glanton (born 1986), American football player

== See also ==
- Damon (given name)
