= Damjanić =

Damjanić (literally "little Damjan"), also transliterated as Damjanich, is a Serbian and Croatian surname. It may refer to:

- János Damjanich (1804–1849), Hungarian general of Serb origin
- Viktor Damjanić (born 2005), Croatian footballer

== See also ==
- Damjanović
- Damnjanović
- Damijanić
