= Bieda =

Bieda is a surname and toponym. It may refer to:

- Blera, town in Italy formerly named Bieda
- Halina Bieda (born 1962), Polish politician
- Jarosława Bieda (born 1937), Polish athlete
- Steve Bieda (born 1961), American politician
