= Damián =

Damian nava
- Gender: Male
- Language: Czech, Slovak, Spanish

Origin
- Origin: Greek
- Meaning: To tame, To master

Other names
- Related names: Damian, Damon

Damián is a Czech, Slovak and Spanish male given name, which is a form of the name Damian. Damian is derived from the Greek name Δαμιανος (Damianos), from the Greek word δαμαζω (damazo), meaning "to tame" or "to master". The given name may refer to:

- Damián Akerman (born 1980), Argentine football player
- Damián Alcázar (born 1953), Mexican actor
- Damián Anache (born 1981), Argentine composer
- Damián Batallini (born 1996), Argentine footballer
- Damián Blaum (born 1981), Argentine swimmer
- Damián de Santo (born 1968), Argentine actor
- Damián Domingo (1796–1834), Filipino painter
- Damián Díaz (born 1986), Argentine football player
- Damián Escudero (born 1987), Argentine footballer
- Damián Genovese (born 1978), Venezuelan actor
- Damián Iguacén Borau (born 1916), Spanish bishop
- Damián Ísmodes (born 1989), Peruvian football player
- Damián Lizio (born 1989), Bolivian football player
- Damián Manso (born 1979), Argentine footballer
- Damián Pérez (born 1988), Argentine football player
- Damián Suárez (born 1988), Uruguayan football player
- Damián Szifron (born 1975), Argentine film and television director
- Damián Villa (born 1990), Mexican taekwondo athlete
