= Damon (given name) =

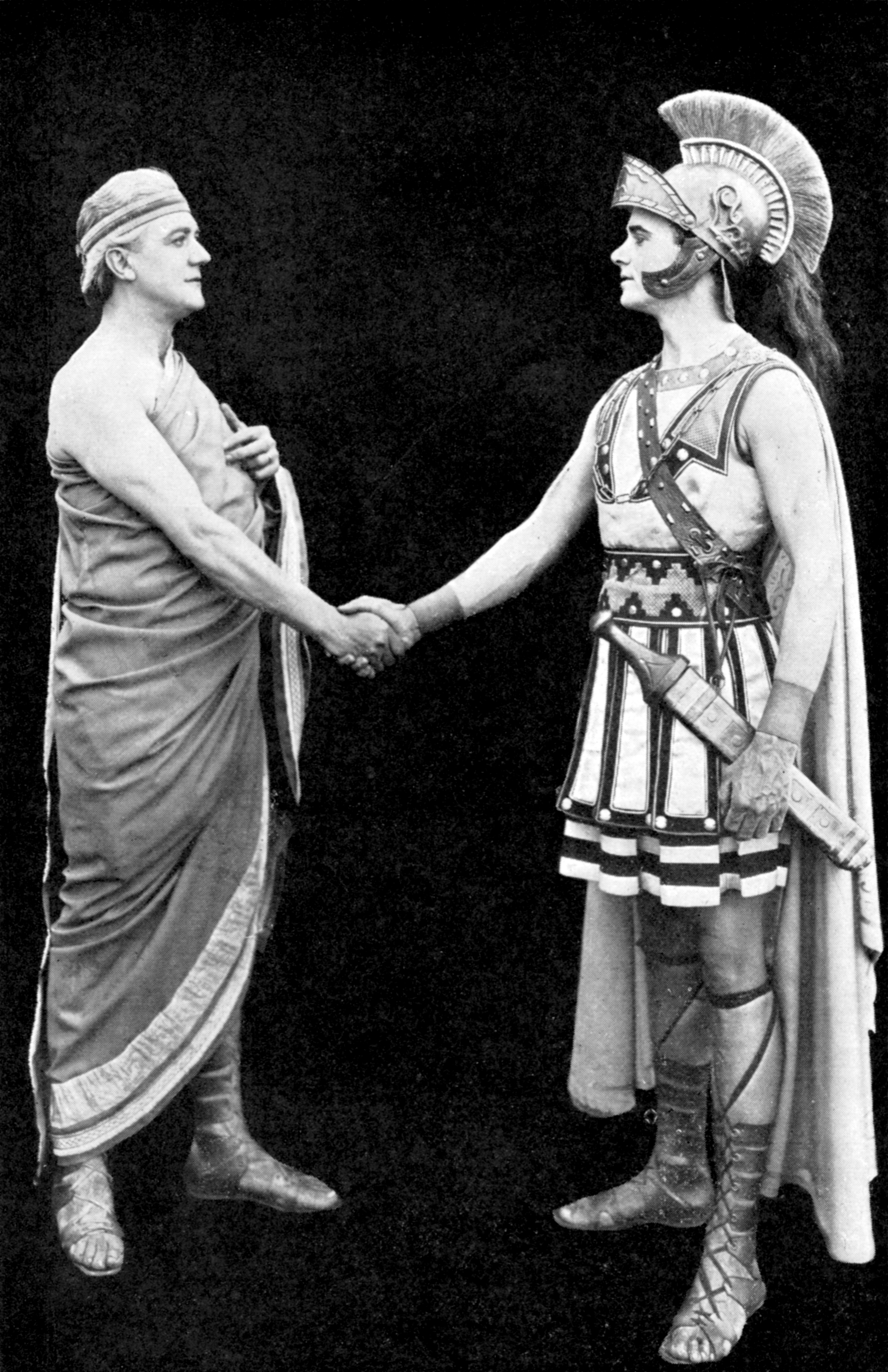
- Damon and Pythias (film, 1914)
- Pronunciation: DAY-mən (English)
- Gender: Male
- Language: English

Origin
- Origin: Greek
- Meaning: "to tame, subdue"
- Region of origin: Ancient Greece

Other names
- Related names: Damian, Damián, Damien

Damon is a masculine given name. It is the English form of the Greek masculine name Δάμων Damōn, derived from δαμάζειν damazein, meaning "to overpower, tame, subdue, conquer".

== People ==
- Damon of Athens, 5th century BC Athenian musicologist
- Damon of Thessalonica, 2nd century BC Macedonian statesman
- Damon Albarn (born 1968), British songwriter and musician
- Damon Allen (born 1963), American football player
- Damon Amendolara, American sports radio host
- Damon Arnette (born 1996), American football player
- Damon Bailey (born 1971), American basketball player and coach
- Damon Beesley, English writer and television producer
- Damon Berryhill (born 1963), Major League Baseball catcher
- Damon Bossino, Gibraltarian barrister and politician
- Damon Bruce, American sports radio host
- Damon Buffini, English businessman
- Damon Buford (born 1970), Major League Baseball player
- Damon Che, rock drummer and guitarist
- Damon Dash (born 1971), American music industry executive
- Damon Dunn, American politician
- Damon Duval, American football player
- Damon Elliott (born 1973), American musician
- Damon Feldman (born 1985), American boxer and businessman
- Damon Galgut (born 1963), South African writer
- Damon Greaves (born 2000), Australian college football player
- Damon Gupton (born 1973), American actor
- Damon Harrison (born 1988), American football player
- Damon Herriman (born 1970), Australian actor
- Damon Heta (born 1987), Australian darts player
- Damon Hill (born 1960), British Formula One driver
- Damon Huard (born 1973), American football player
- Damon Knight, American science fiction writer
- Damon Lindelof (born 1973), American screenwriter
- Damon Lowery (born 1967), American basketball player
- Damon M. Cummings (1910–1942), United States Navy officer
- Damon Payne (born 2003), American football player
- Damon Pieri (born 1970), American football player
- Damon Rich (born 1975), American designer and planner
- Damon Runyon (1884–1946), American newspaperman and writer
- Damon Severson (born 1994), Canadian ice hockey defenseman
- Damon Sheehy-Guiseppi (born 1994), American football player
- Damon Stoudamire (born 1973), American basketball player
- Damon Stryker, former alias of Canadian pro wrestler Adam Copeland
- Damon Thomas (American football) (born 1970), American football player
- Damon Thomas (politician) (born 1949), Australian public official
- Damon Thomas (record producer), American record producer, half of The Underdogs duo
- Damon Tweedy, American physician and academic
- Damon Wayans (born 1960), American comedic actor
- Damon Webb (born 1995), American football player
- Damon Wilson II, American football player

== Fictional characters ==
- Damon, in the Greek legend of Damon and Pythias
- Damon Carter, in the American television series Soul Food
- Damon Salvatore, in L. J. Smith's novel series The Vampire Diaries and the television series
- Damon Henderson, in the American television series Power Rangers Lost Galaxy.
- Damon Baird, in the American Video Game series Gears of War

== See also ==
- Damon (surname)
- Damien (disambiguation)
