= Osogovo Monastery =

Macedonian Orthodox monastery near Kriva Palanka, North Macedonia

Coordinates: 42°12′31″N 22°21′44″E

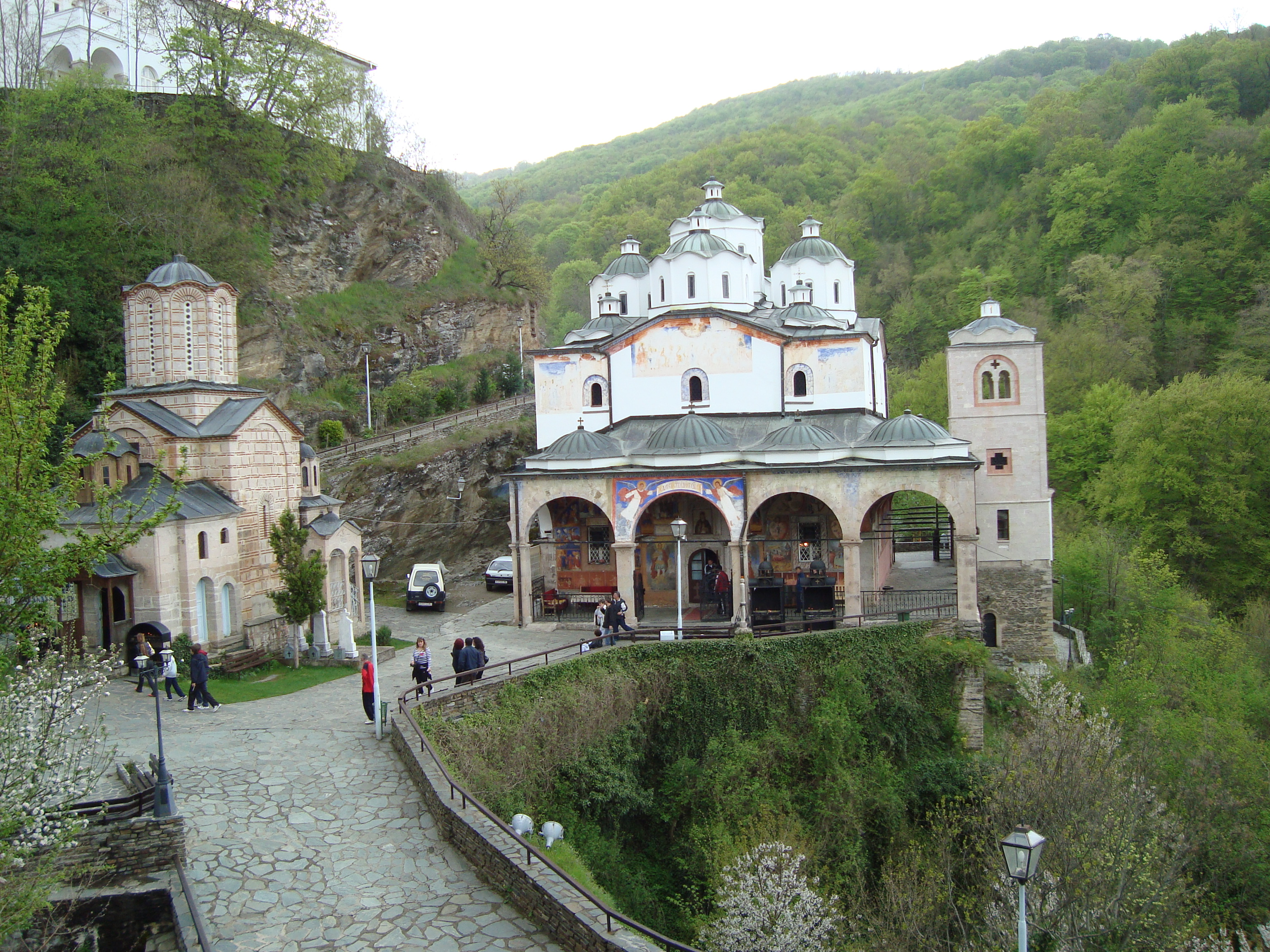
- Osogovo Monastery with the Church of St. Joachim of Osogovo to the right and the Church of the Holy Mother of God to the left
- Interactive map of Osogovo Monastery

Monastery information
- Order: Macedonian Orthodox
- Established: 12th century
- Dedication: St Joachim and St Mary
- Diocese: Diocese of Polog and Kumanovo
- Controlled churches: Church of St Joachim; Church of the Holy Mother of God

People
- Founder: Teodor of Ovče Pole

Site
- Location: Kriva Palanka Municipality
- Public access: yes

Osogovo Monastery (Macedonian: Осоговски Манастир) is a Macedonian Orthodox monastery located near Kriva Palanka, North Macedonia, 10 kilometres (6.2 mi) from the Bulgarian border on Osogovo Mountain. Osogovo Monastery is home to an art colony and to an architecture school during the summer.

== Description ==
The monastery consists of two churches including the larger "Saint Joachim of Osogovo" and the smaller "Holy Mother of God." The monastery grounds also consist of a bell tower, dormitories, a guardhouse, and a residency for the Head of the Macedonian Orthodox Church.

The monastery was founded in the 12th century, though there are no remains of the original monastery. The smaller church in today's monastery complex got its present look in the 14th century, while the larger one was built in the 19th century.

The larger, three-nave church, was built in 1851 by Andrey Damyanov. It has 12 cupolas, which represent the 12 apostles, and porches on its southern and western sides. Most of the church's interior and cupolas were painted by Dimitar Andonov Papradiški. The smaller and older church, founded in the 12th century and rebuilt in the 14th century, is dedicated to the Holy Mother of God.

Osogovo Monastery is situated 825 metres (2,707 feet) above sea level.

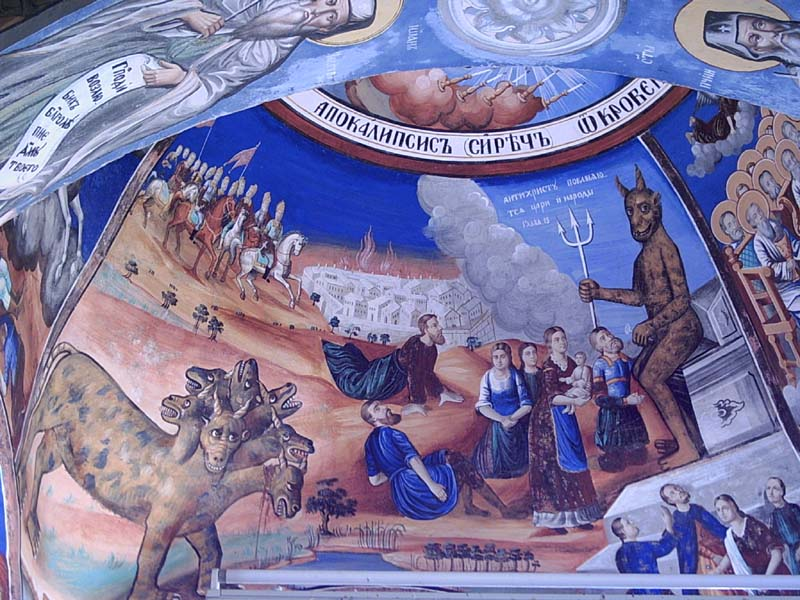
Fresco depicting Satan

== History ==
The monastery was founded by a priest from Ovče Pole in the mid-12th century.

In the time of the Byzantine Emperor Manuel I Komnenos, the memory of this saint was renewed. At that time, Father Teodor de Ovče Polje arrived there, who became a monk and took the name Teofan. He gathered around him a large number of monks and with them he built a church and a monastery to Venerable Joachim, of whom he later became the first abbot. According to one source (Karlovac chronicler), this monastery was "rebuilt" by Serbian king Milutin Nemanjić.

The monastery of Saint Joachim of Osogovo was visited, helped and renovated several times by Serbian rulers Nemanjić, especially by Saint King Milutin and his son Saint Stephen of Decani. The famous Serbian ascetic and Mount Athos elder Isaiah de Serres (c. 1350) also became a monk at this monastery.

The monastery is mentioned in the writings of Emperor Kaloyan (1196–1207). The Karlovac Chronicle (1505) states that the Serbian king Stefan Uroš II Milutin had a church built dedicated to Saint Joachim of Osogovo. In 1330 Serbian king Stefan Uroš III of Decani stayed at the monastery before the Battle of Velbazhd. Turkish Sultan Mehmed II the Conqueror resided at the monastery in 1436 before his military campaign in Bosnia. The abbot of the monastery of Arsenija died there in 1489.

In 1585, during Ottoman rule, the church was converted to mosque for a short period of time after the bey of Kriva Palanka renovated it, though it soon became a church again.

During the Austro-Ottoman War of 1690, the monastery was severely damaged and was to be destroyed by the Ottomans as punishment to the locals for siding with the Austrians during the war. Legend claims that the Ottomans spared the church after becoming overpowered by some spiritual force. The monastery was renovated and redecorated after the First World War in then Southern Serbia.

In 2020, Serbian media revealed that frescoes depicting Serbian saints and medieval rulers, such as Stefan Dečanski and Lazar of Serbia, were retouched and new names inscribed, which was done in an artistically crude way and without the permission of local institutions. According to the Spona organisation, this act damaged the artistic value of the monastery.

== Gallery ==
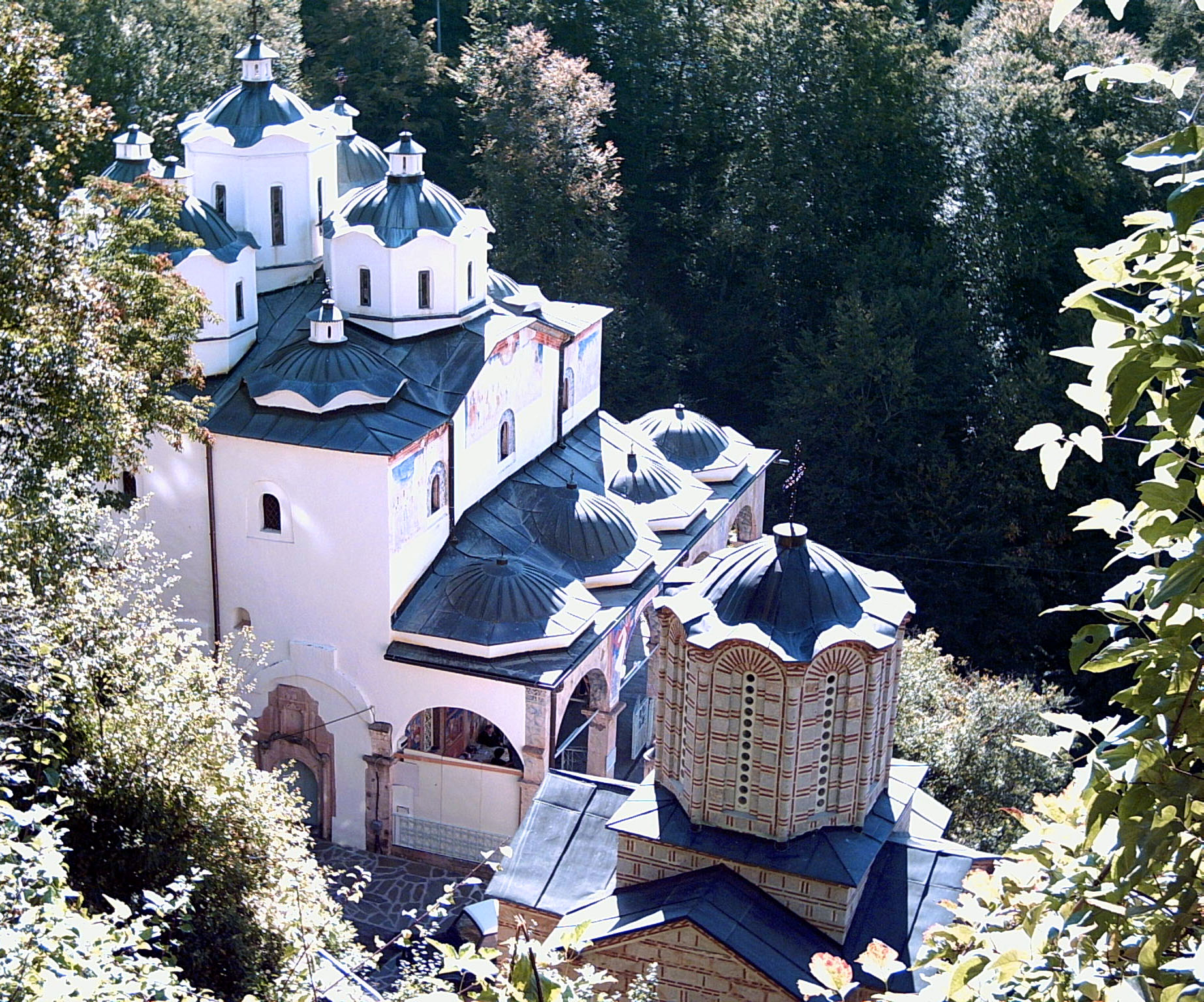
St. Joachim of Osogovo Monastery

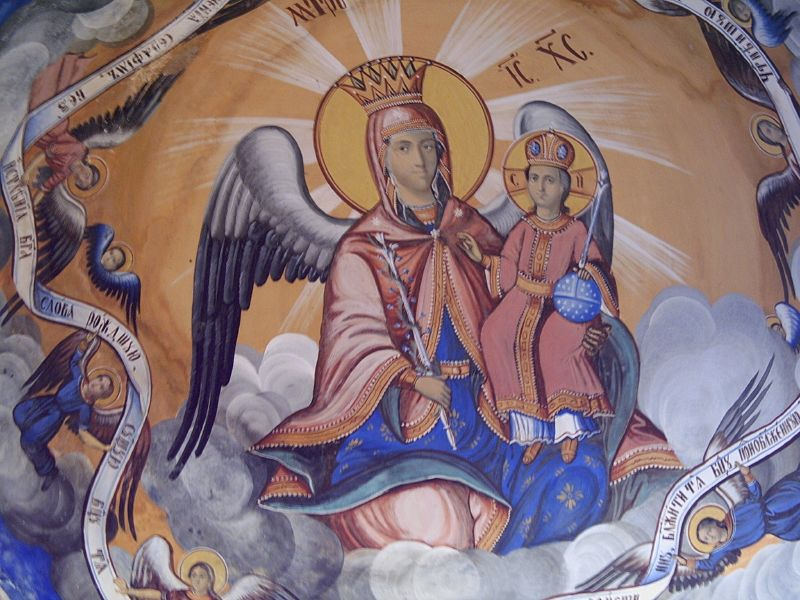
A fresco

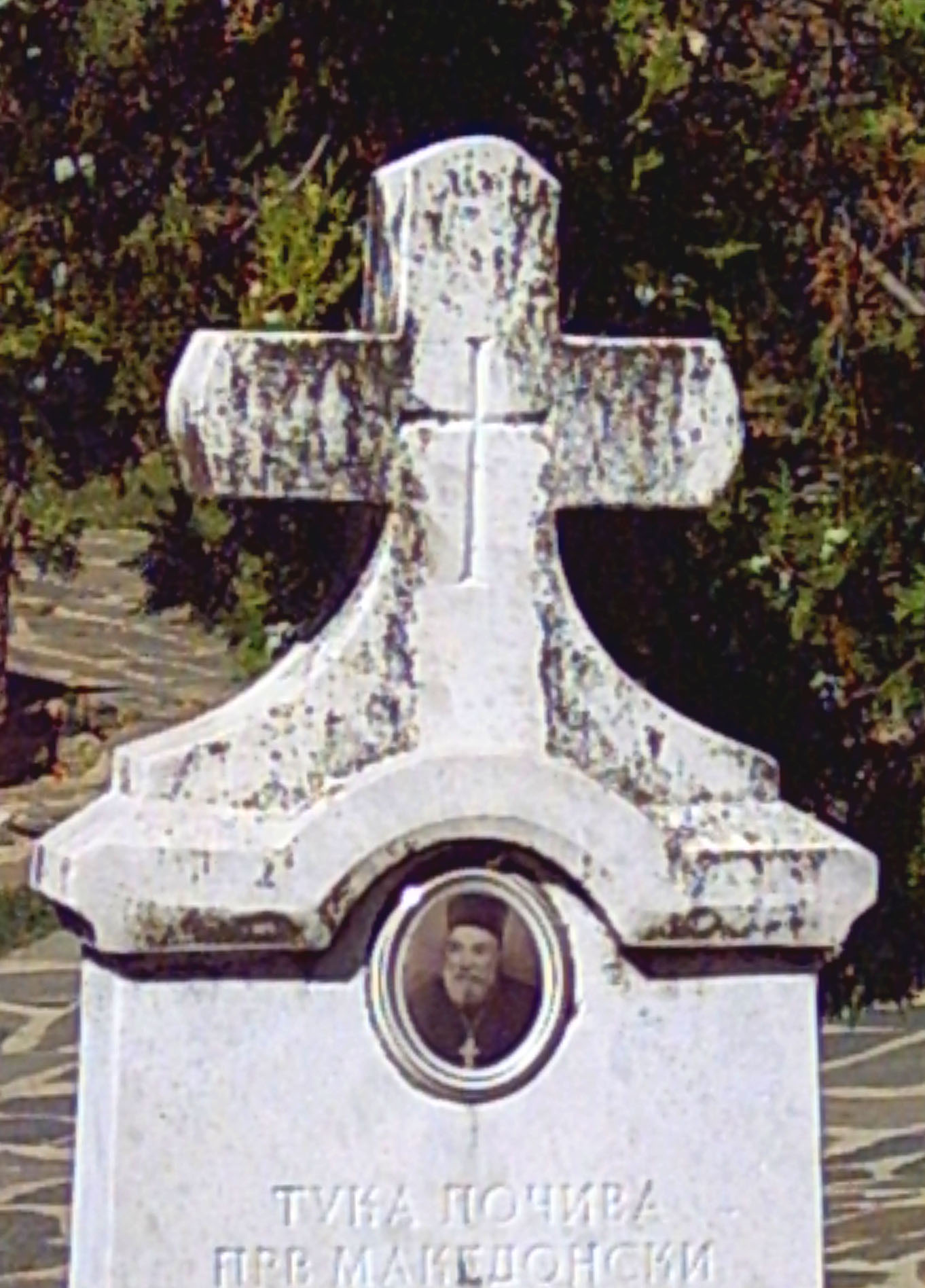
Tomb at the monastery

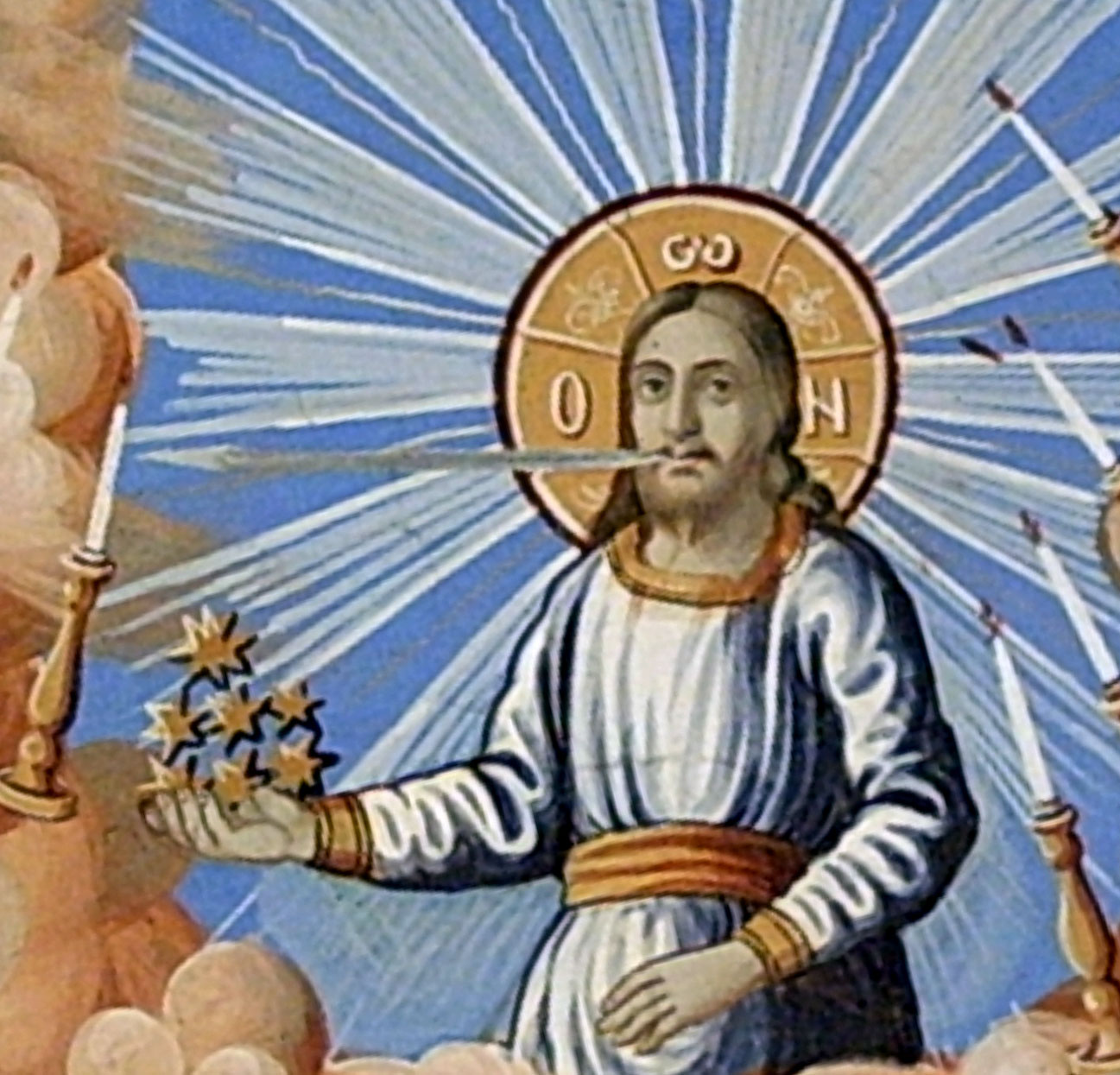
Another fresco

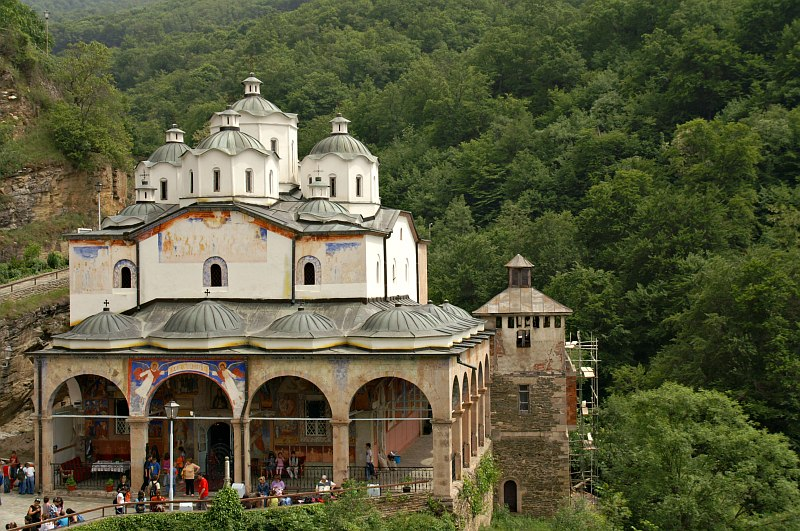
Church of St. Joachim of Osogovo

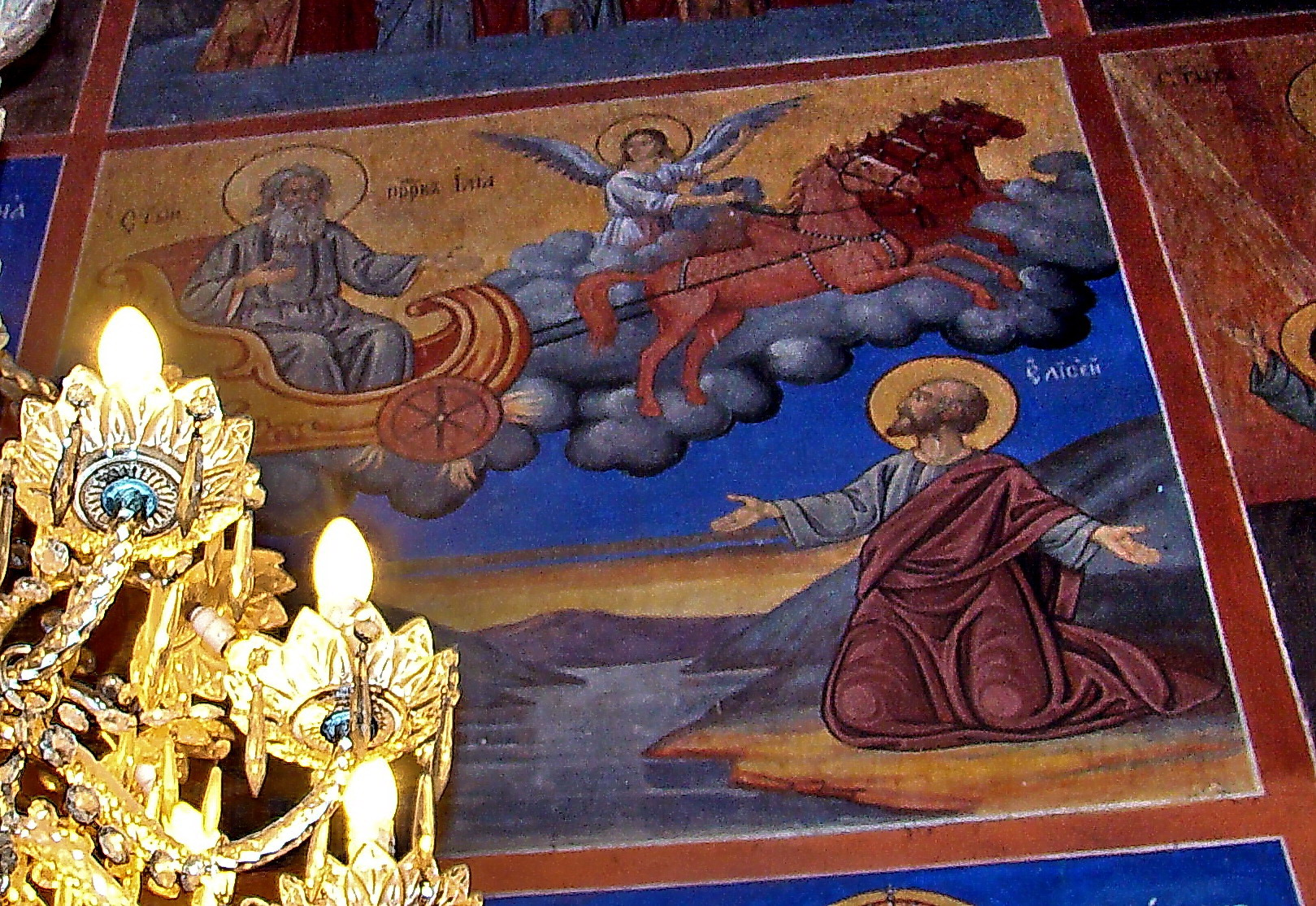
Chandelier and frescoes

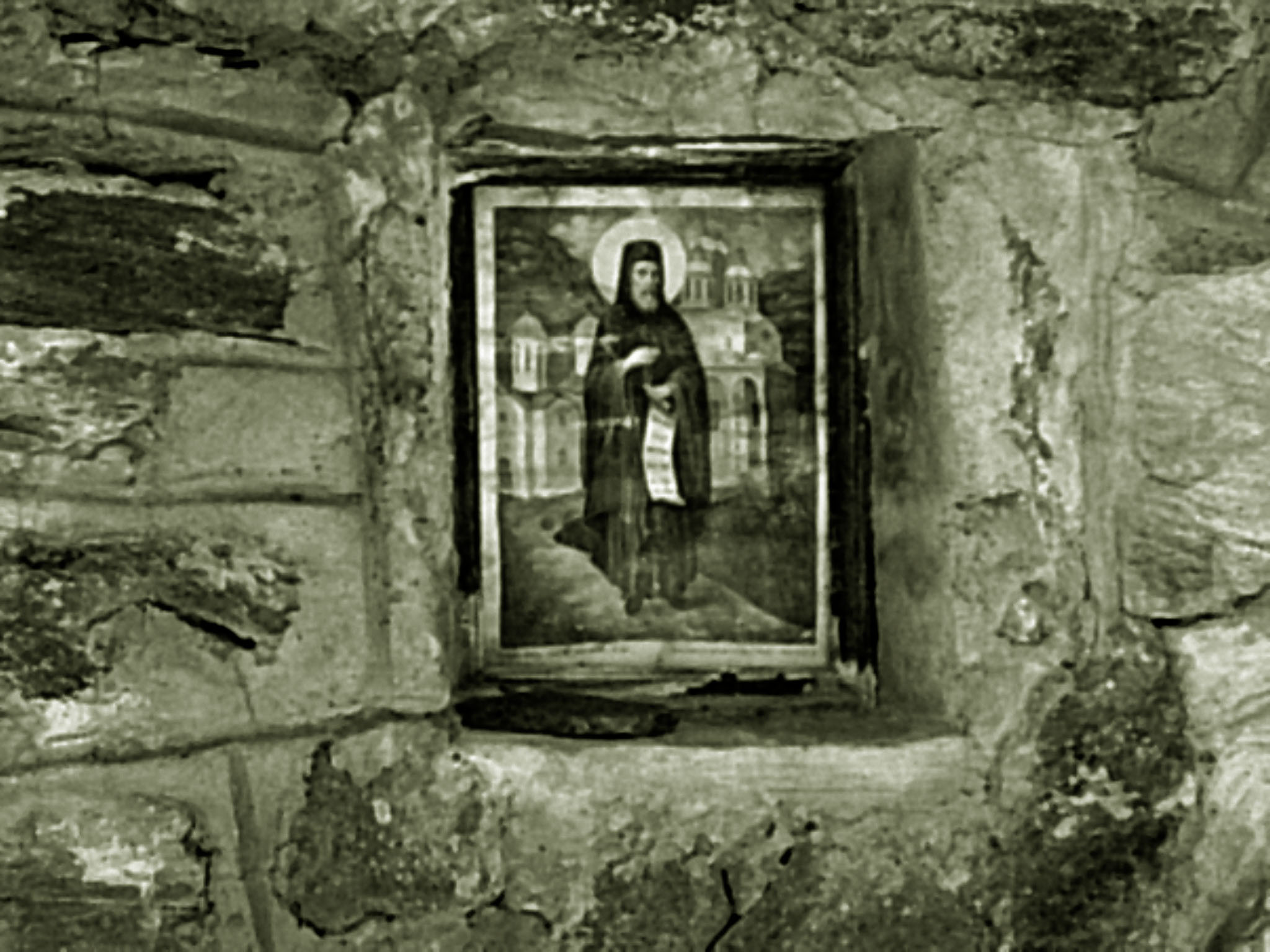
Icon
