= Damyan =

Damyan (Bulgarian: Дамян) is a Bulgarian masculine given name, a form of Damian. Notable people with the given name include:

- Damyan Damyanov (born 2000), Bulgarian footballer
- Damyan Pilkov (born 1995), Bulgarian lawyer and businessman
- Damyan Georgiev (1950–2020), Bulgarian footballer
- Dame Gruev (1871–1906), Bulgarian teacher, revolutionary and insurgent leader
- Damyan Hristov (born 2002), Bulgarian footballer
- Dame Stoykov (born 1966), Bulgarian judoka
- Damyan Velchev (1883–1954), Bulgarian politician and general

== See also ==
- Damyanov, a surname derived from this name
