= Damone =

Damone may refer to:

- Damone (band), an American hard rock/glam metal band
- Damone (given name)
- Damone, one of the 50 daughters of Danaus in Greek mythology

== People with the surname ==
- Vic Damone (1928–2018), American singer
