= Church of St. Nicholas, Kumanovo =

Coordinates: 42.1372°N 21.7206°E

- Црква „Свети Никола” Куманово
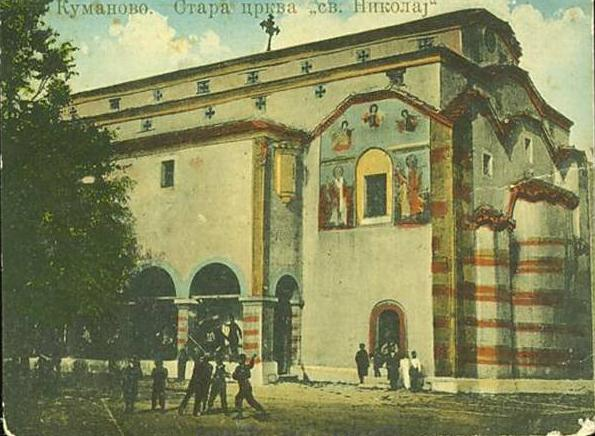
- Church of St. Nicholas, Kumanovo
- Location: Kumanovo
- Country: North Macedonia
- Denomination: Macedonian Orthodox Church
- Previous denomination: Patriarchate of Constantinople
- Website: koe.mk

History
- Status: Church
- Founded: 1851
- Dedication: St. Nicholas

Architecture
- Architect: Andreja Damjanov
- Architectural type: Three-nave basilic church
- Construction cost: confidential

Specifications
- Materials: Brick

Administration
- Province: Kumanovo
- Diocese: Diocese of Kumanovo and Osogovo

Clergy
- Archbishop: Stefan
- Bishop: Josif

The church of St. Nikolas in Kumanovo (Macedonian: Црква Свети Никола, Куманово), North Macedonia, is a Macedonian Eastern Orthodox church designed by Andrey Damyanov. It is surrounded by arcades and has a rich interior with galleries, frescoes and furniture. The construction of the church was finished in 1860 on the same site as a prior church (with the same patron) in the "Varosh maalo".

The church is a tree-aisle monumental basilica-type building, characteristic of the sacred buildings in the Balkans in the 19th century. It is built from stone and bricks. On the northern side there is a porch with colonnades. The central aisle is over-topped with four blind domes. Above the northern, western and southern part of the church extends a gallery where a collection of icons is placed. Above the western part of the gallery extends another one but with smaller dimensions.

There are icons in the church, painted by the Bulgarian painter Kosta Krastev in 1856.

== Gallery ==
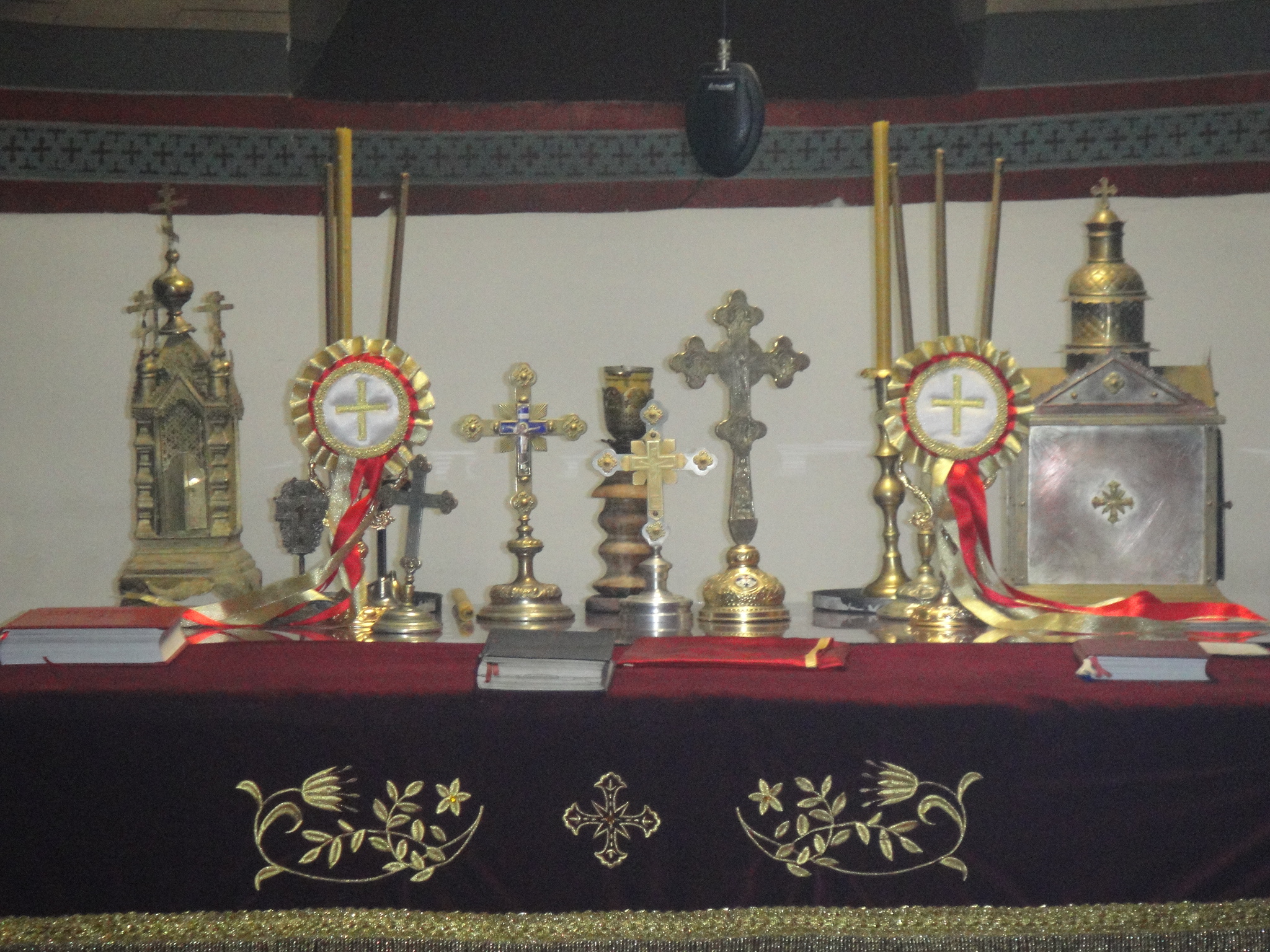
St. Nicholas' altar

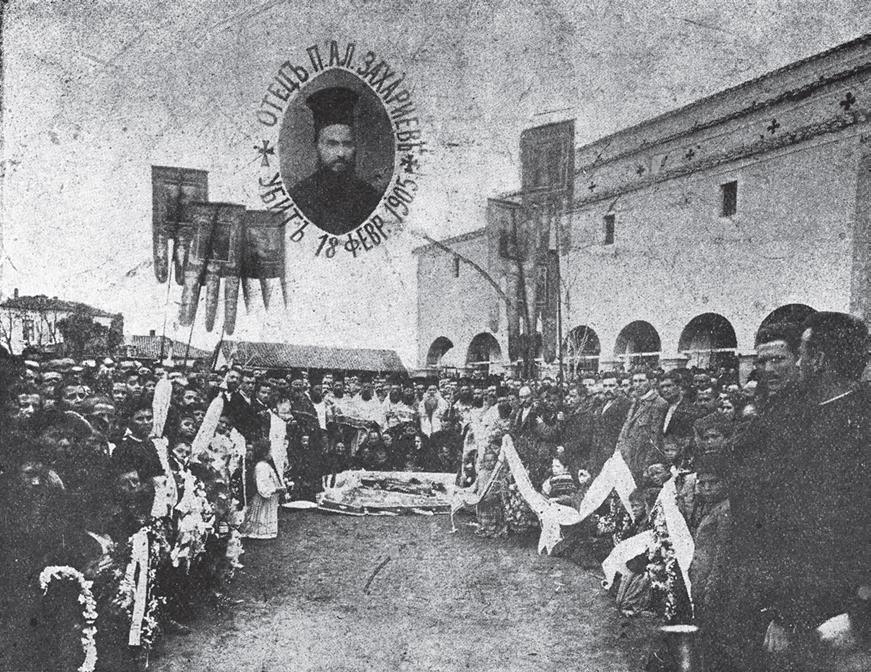
The church in 1905

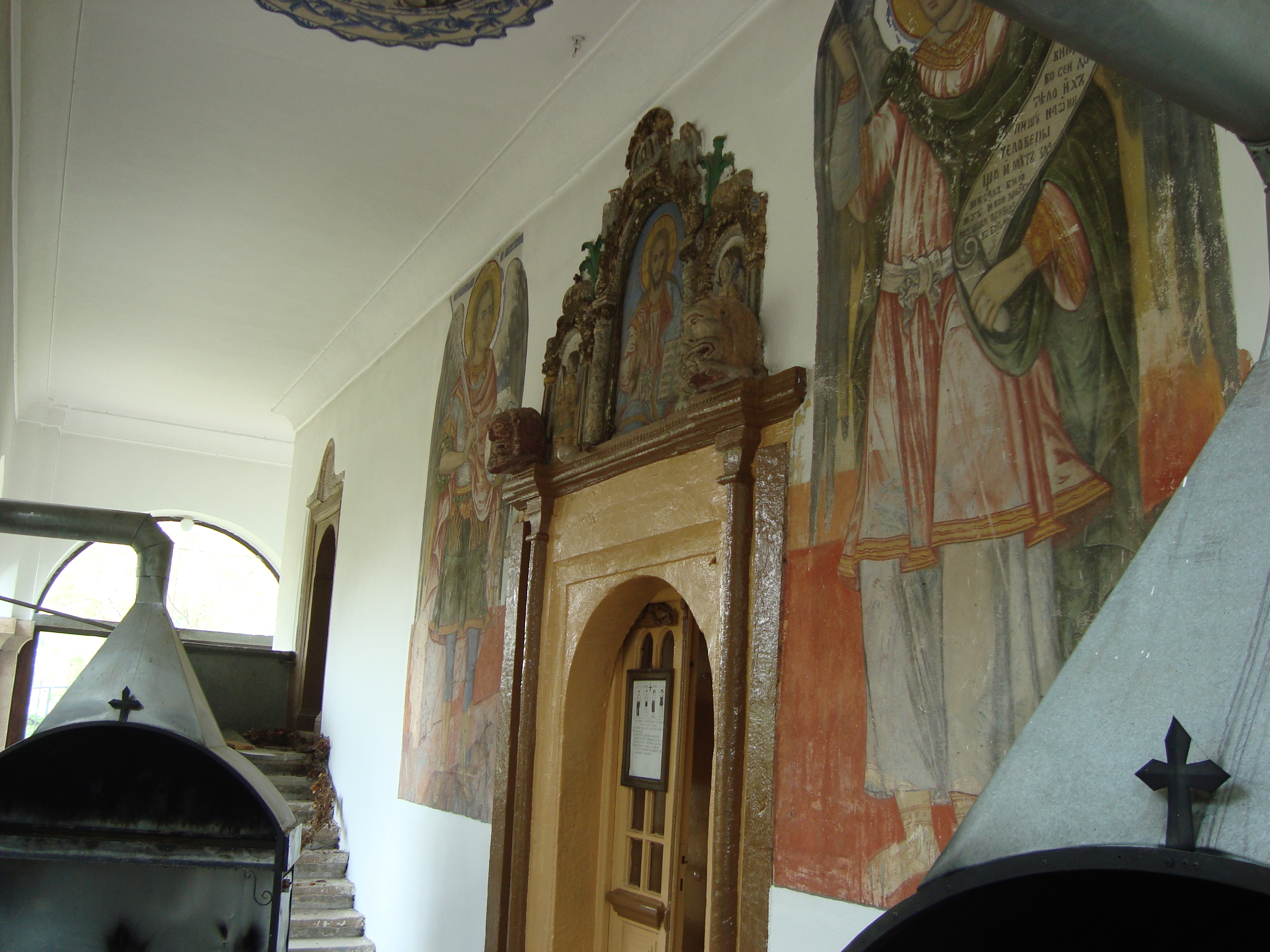
In the church

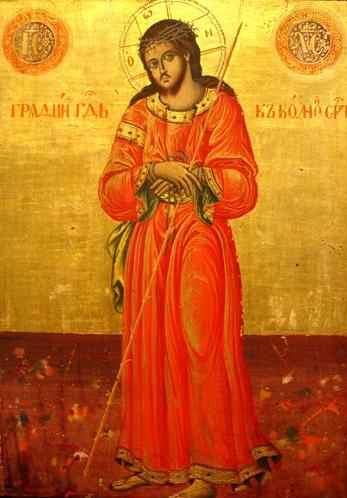
Icon from the church 19th century

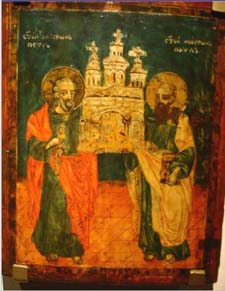
Icon from the church 19th century

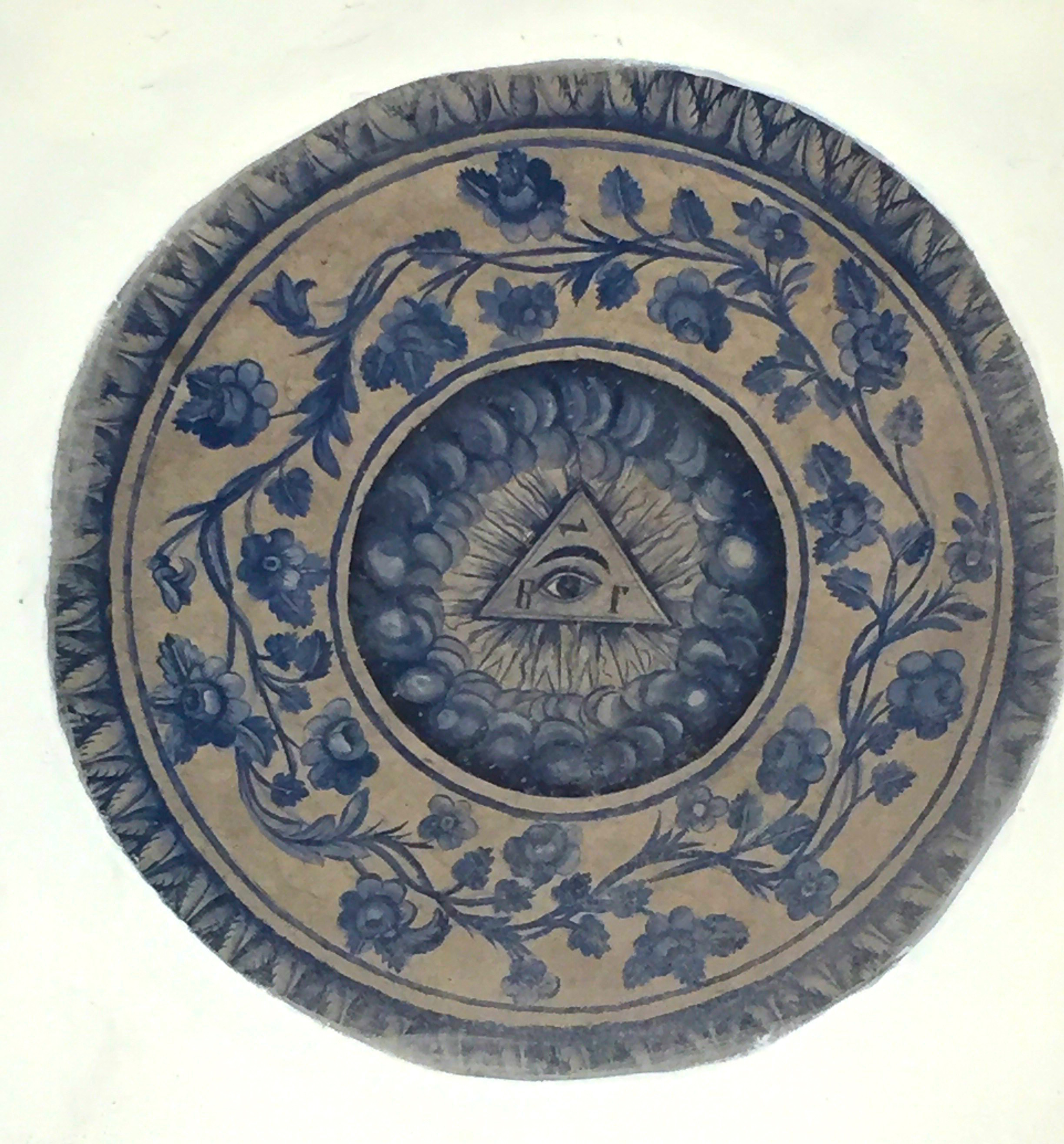
The Eye of Providence on the antechamber's ceiling

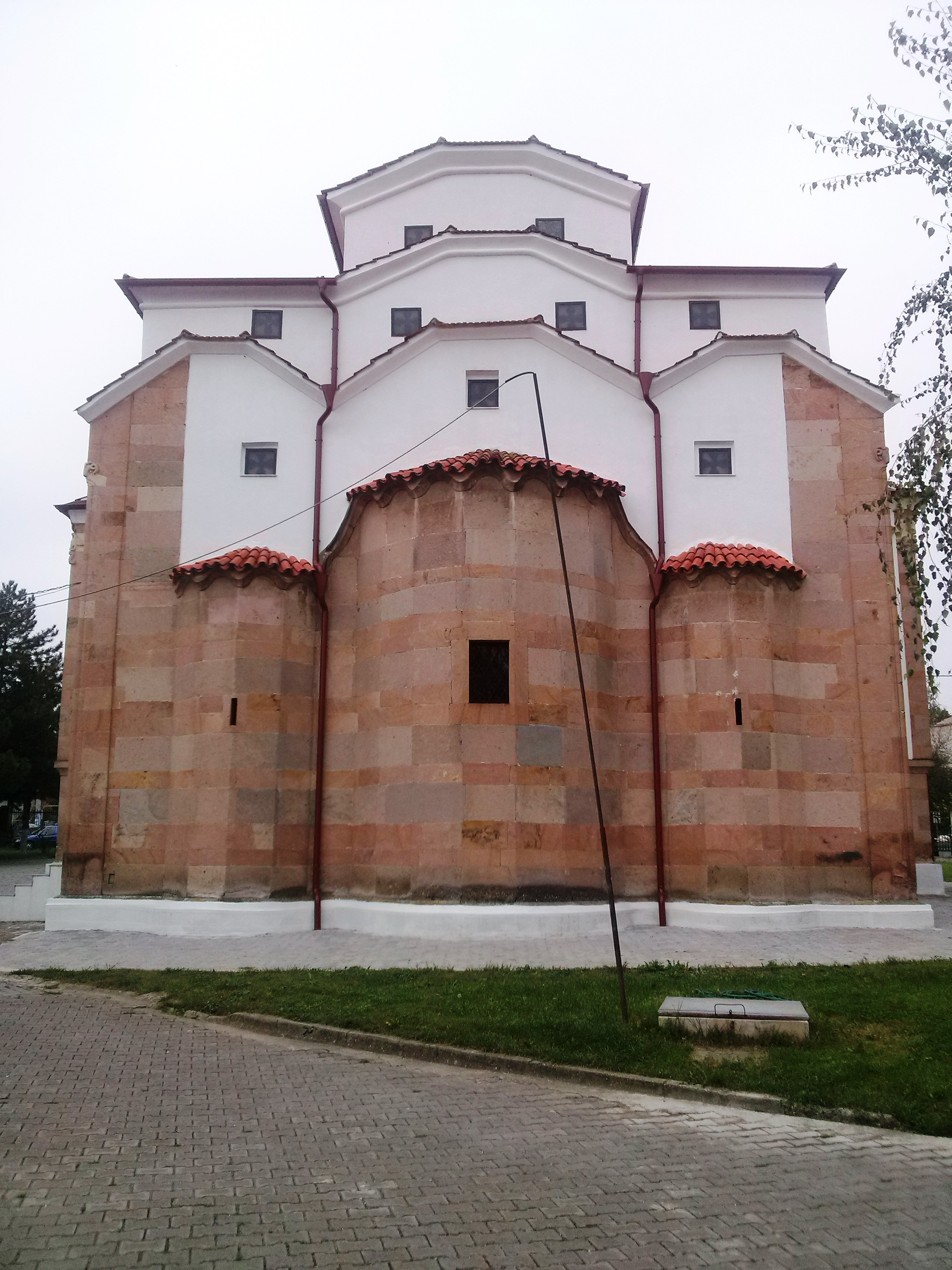
Exterior of the church

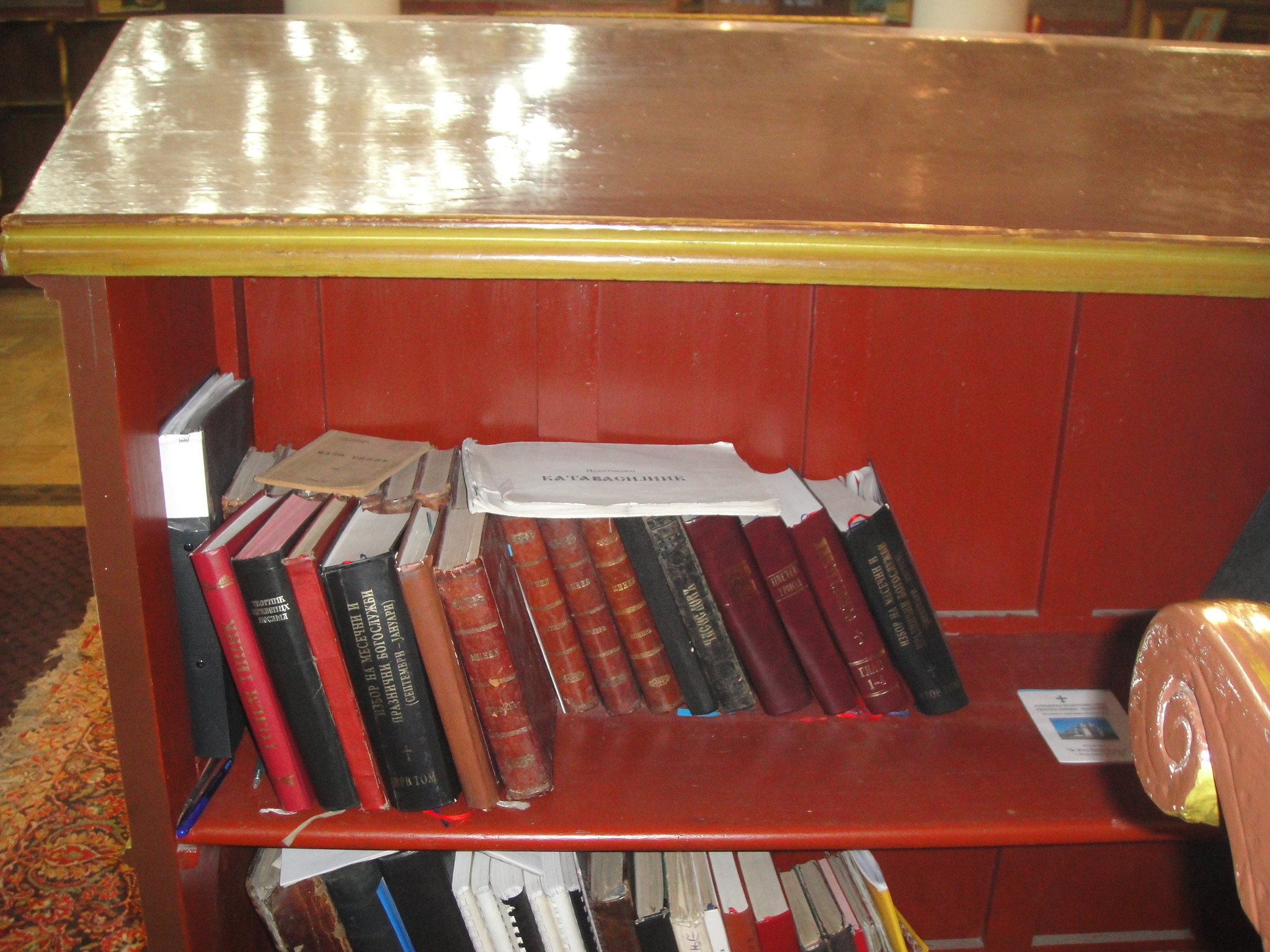
Church library

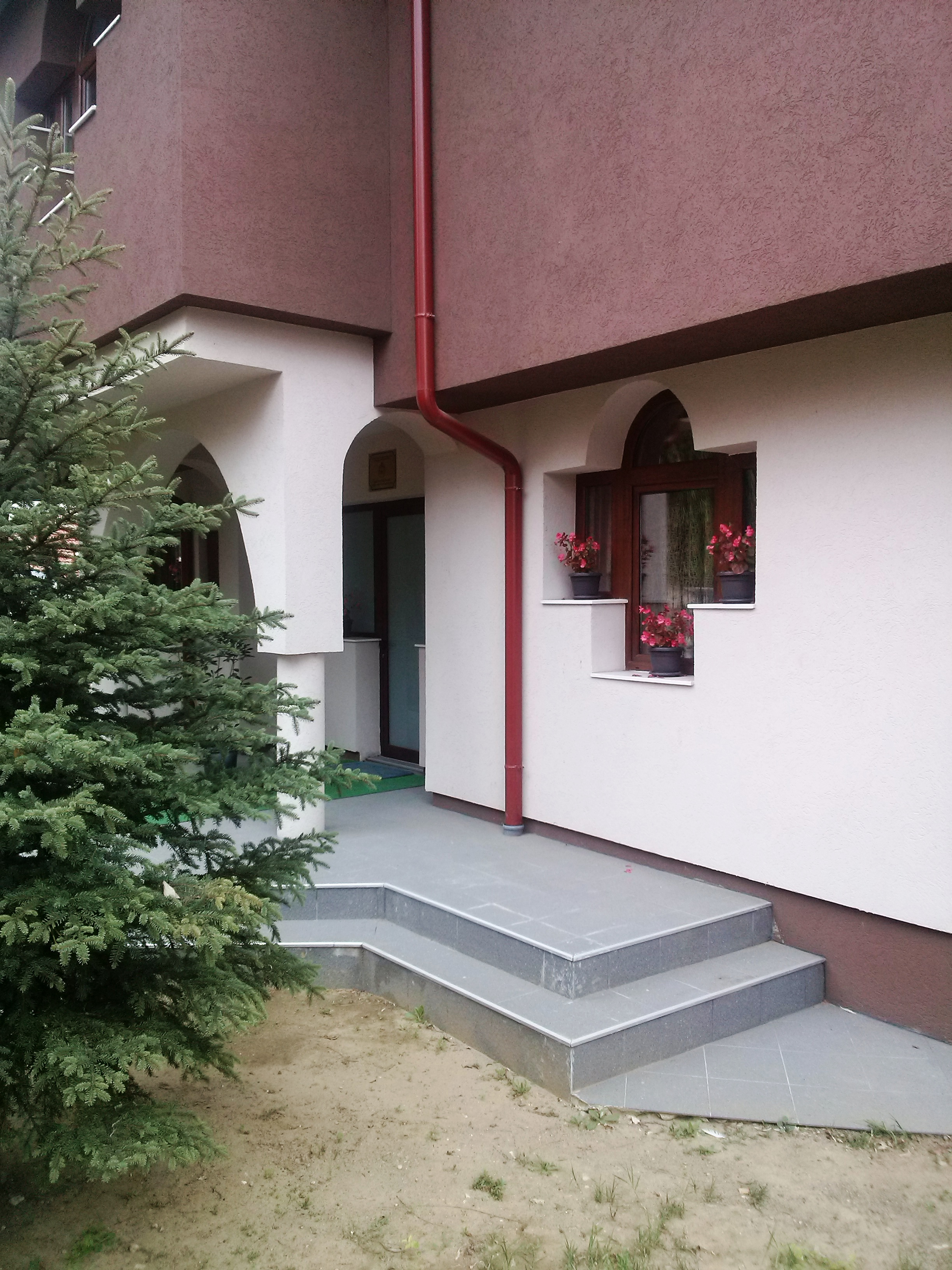
The seat of the Metropolitan of Diocese of Kumanovo and Osogovo in the church yard
