= Damian (given name) =

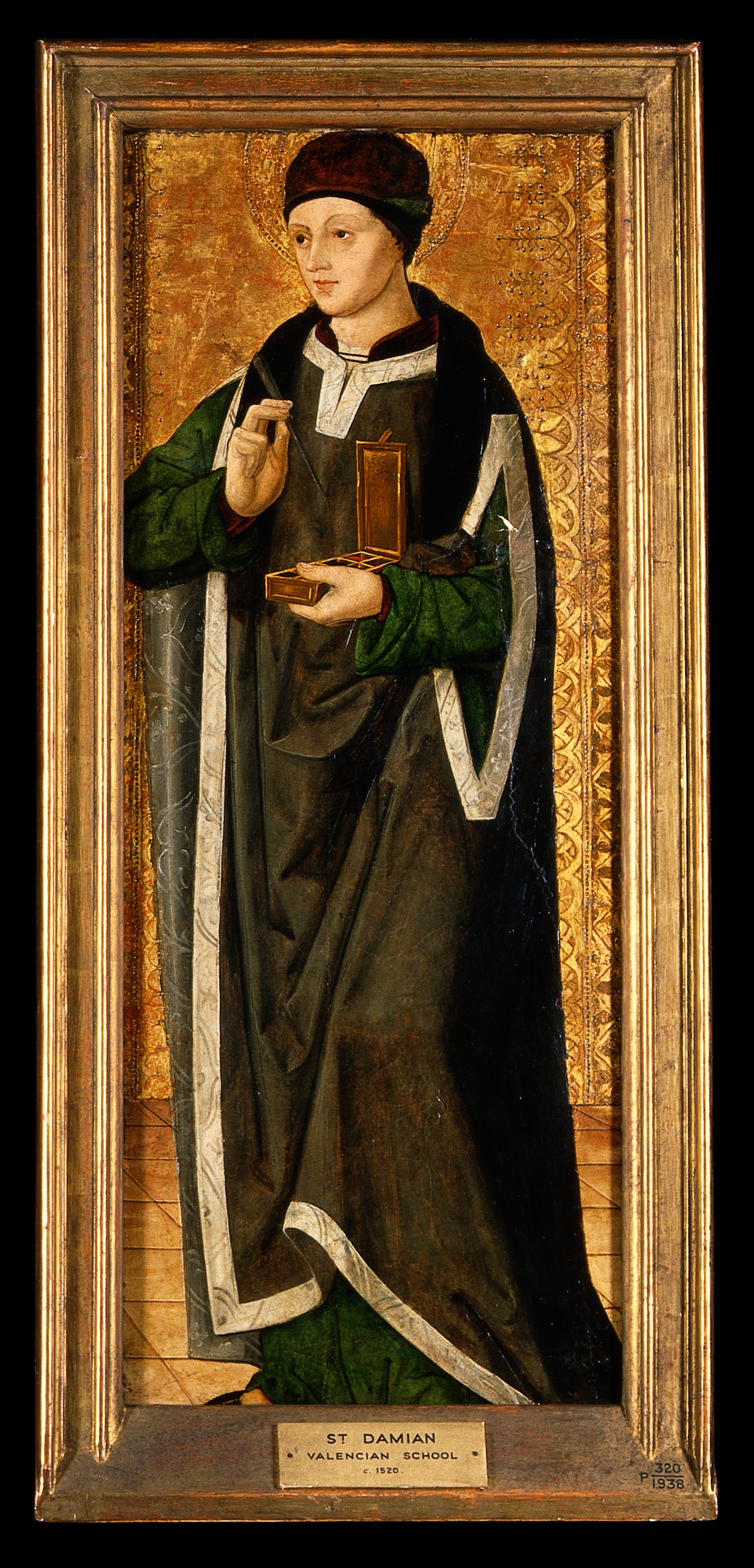
- Saint Damian
- Pronunciation: /ˈdeɪmiən/
- Gender: Male

Origin
- Origin: Greece
- Meaning: to tame
- Region of origin: Greece

Other names
- Related names: Damián, Damien, Damon, Damião, Дамиан (Damian), Дамјан (Damjan), Дамян (Damyan), Демьян (Demyan), دامون (Dāmun), دیمون (Deymun), دامیان (Dāmyān/Dāmiān)

Damian (also spelled Damien, Daymian, Daman, Damon, Daemon, Damion, Daymein, Damyean, Damiano, Domino, Demian, دامیان, Damião amongst others) is a given name that comes from Damianus, which is the latinisation of the Greek name Δαμιανός (Damianos), derived from the Greek word δαμάζω (damazō), "(I) conquer, master, overcome, tame", in the form of δαμάω/-ῶ (damaō), a form assumed as the first person of δαμᾷ (damāi).

== Historical figures ==
Notable persons with the name include:

- Deruvian, sometimes called Damian, legendary 2nd-century bishop and saint
- Damian of Ephesus, Greek rhetorician
- Damian of Thessalonica, Greek physician
- Saints Cosmas and Damian (died c. 303), early Christian martyrs, patrons of physicians and surgeons
- Damian, two conflated early Christian martyrs
- Coptic Pope Damian of Alexandria (died 605)
- Damianus (died 669), a bishop of Rochester, named after one of the above martyrs
- Damian of Pavia (d. 710), Bishop of Pavia and saint
- Damian of Tarsus (d. 924), Byzantine renegade and Muslim admiral
- Pedro Damiano (1480–1544), Portuguese chess player
- Damian I of Jerusalem (1848–1931), Greek Orthodox Patriarch of Jerusalem from 1897 to 1931
- Saint Damien of Moloka’i (1840–1889), Roman Catholic missionary to the leper colony on the Hawaiian island of Moloka'i, revered for his ministry that resulted in his own death from leprosy
- Damjan Štrbac (1912–1941), Serbian priest, hieromartyr, and saint, venerated as Saint Damian of Grahovo

== Contemporary people ==
=== Arts ===
- Damian, full name Damian Gerard Baker (1964–2017), English pop musician and actor, known by his mononym Damian
- Damian Chapa (born 1962), American actor director star of Blood In Blood Out
- Damien Echols (born 1974), American author, one of three members of The West Memphis Three
- Damian Hardung (born 1998), German actor
- Damian Higgins (born 1972), real name of American DJ DieselBoy
- Damian Lewis (born 1971), English actor
- Damian Marley (born 1978), Grammy-winning reggae artist and son of Bob Marley
- Damian McGinty (born 1992), Irish singer and actor
- Damian O'Hare (born 1977), Northern-Irish actor
- Damian Smith (born 1972 or 1973), Australian ballet dancer
- Damian Wilson (born 1969), English musician, songwriter and vocalist
- Damian Woetzel (born 1967), New York City Ballet principal dancer, retired 2008

=== Sports ===
- Damian Browne (born 1980), Irish rugby union player
- Damian Clara (born 2005), Italian professional ice hockey player
- Damián Escudero (born 1987), Argentine professional footballer
- Damián Furmanski (born 1975), Argentinean tennis player
- Damian Lillard (born 1990), basketball player for the Portland Trail Blazers
- Damian Mackle (born 1985), Northern-Irish professional wrestler, known professionally as Killian Dain
- Damian Martin (born 1984), Australian basketball player
- Damian Matthew (born 1970), English football manager
- Damian Militaru (born 1967), Romanian footballer
- Damian Sexton (born 1968), Australian footballer
- Damian Swann (born 1992), American football player
- Damian Chong Qui (born 1998), American basketball player
- Damian Żurek (born 1999), Polish speed skater

=== Politics ===
- Damian Bartyla, Polish lawyer and local politician
- Damian Collins (born 1974), British politician
- Damian Green (born 1956), British politician
- Damian Lyder, Trinidad and Tobago politician
- Damian McBride (born 1974), former special adviser to British Prime Minister Gordon Brown
- Damian Stoilov, Canadian politician

=== Others ===
- Damian Conway (born 1964), Australian computer science professor, author and prominent perl programmer
- Damian Fernando (born 1982), Sri Lankan cricketer
- Damian C. Fernando, Sri Lankan naval officer and 27th Commander of the Navy
- Damian Milton (born 1973), British sociologist and social psychologist
- Damian Zimoń (1940–2012), Polish Roman Catholic prelate

== Fiction ==
- Damian Cray, character from the novel Eagle Strike by Anthony Horowitz
- Damian Desmond, a character from anime/manga series Spy × Family
- Damian Hart, a character from Beyblade: Metal Fight
- Damian Hayes, a character in Degrassi: The Next Generation
- Damian Wayne, a DC comics character, the son of Bruce Wayne (Batman) and Talia Al Ghul

== See also ==
- Damián
- Damien
- Damjan
- Damon
