= Andrey Damyanov =

Ottoman architect

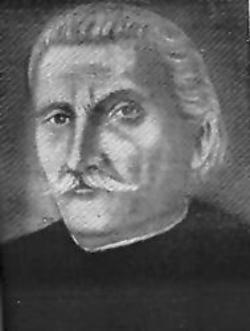
- Portrait of Andrey Damyanov
- Born: 1813; Papradište, Ottoman Empire, (present-day North Macedonia)
- Died: 1878 (aged 64–65); Veles, Ottoman Empire (present-day North Macedonia)
- Occupation: Architect
- Buildings: Osogovo Monastery, Church St. Nicholas

Andrey Damyanov (Bulgarian: Андрей Дамянов; Macedonian: Андреја Дамјанов; Serbian: Андреја Дамјанов) (1813–1878), or Andreja Damjanović was an architect from the modern-day North Macedonia. His works include more than 40 buildings, most of them churches, built between 1835 and 1878, and spread along the Vardar and Morava Valley, with an extension of his works found in Bosnia and Herzegovina as well.

== Origin ==
Damyanov has often been included in histories of the Bulgarian and Serbian architectural literature, but his biography does not reveal the existence of specific national motivation behind his works. He has been also described as a "Macedonian master" in North Macedonia, but Macedonian identity was inchoate at that time.

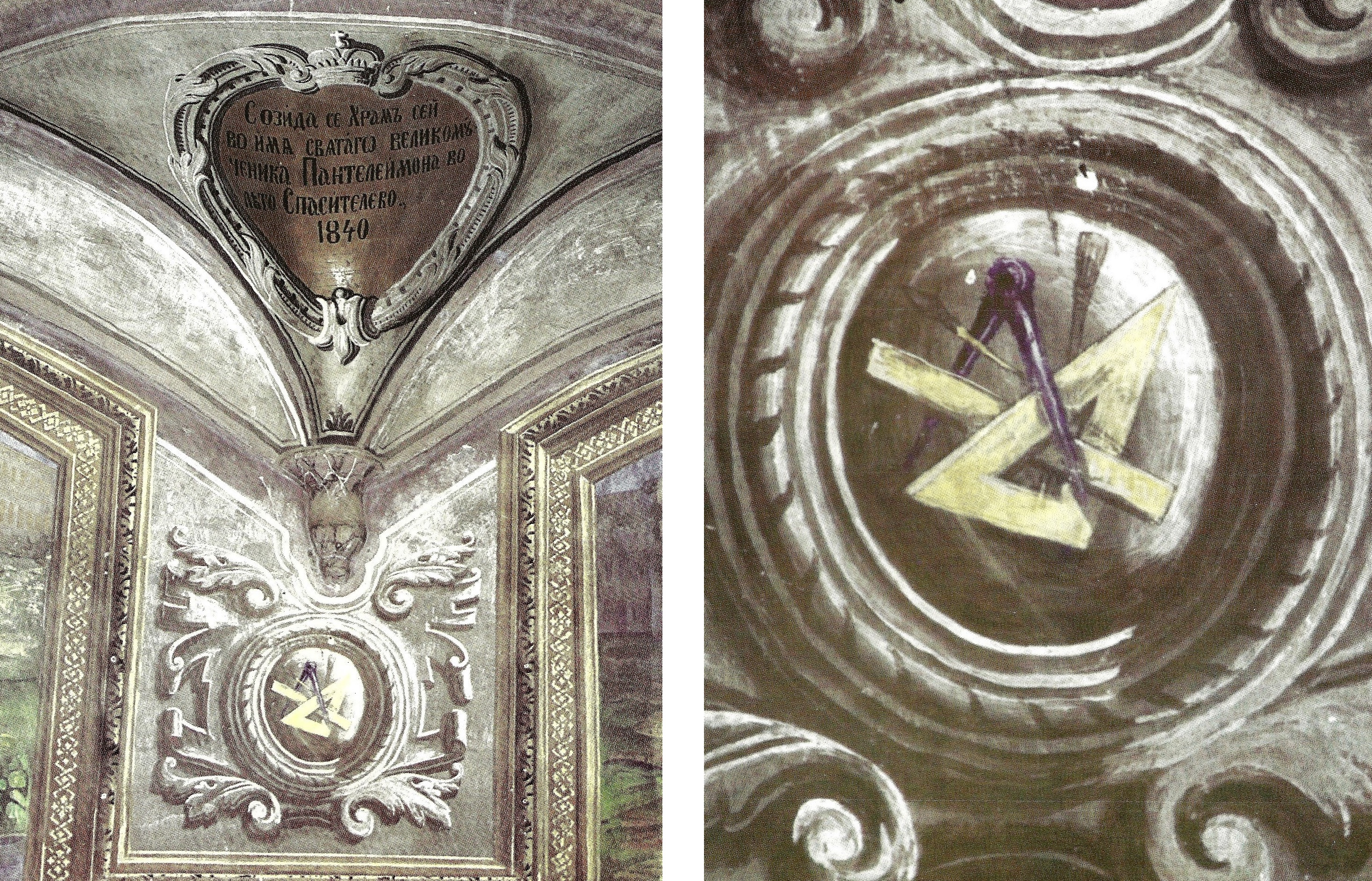
The insignia of Andrey Damyanov as seen on the walls of the St. Panteleimon church in Veles, North Macedonia

Andrey Damyanov comes from a notable Mijak family of architects, Icon-painters and sculptors originating in Debar, western Macedonia, the Renzovski-Zografski-Dospevski. His grandfather is Siljan Renzovski who was mentioned in the construction of Veles-quarters of Emin Aga. For him is known data, that his group worked in Thrace, Edirne and Istanbul. Sons of Siljan, Jankula and Stephen, were also builders and worked in Thessaloniki, Drama, Kavala, Serres and İzmir. His father, Damjan, was a church builder in Greece. Andrey had three brothers, Gjorgi the painter, Nikola the wood carver, and Kosta, who helped them all.

Andrey had a son, Dame, who worked at the seminary and a church in Prizren, and the church in Kosovska Mitrovica. Andrey was the grandfather of the Bulgarian architect and war-time officer Simeon Zografov.

== Work and legacy ==
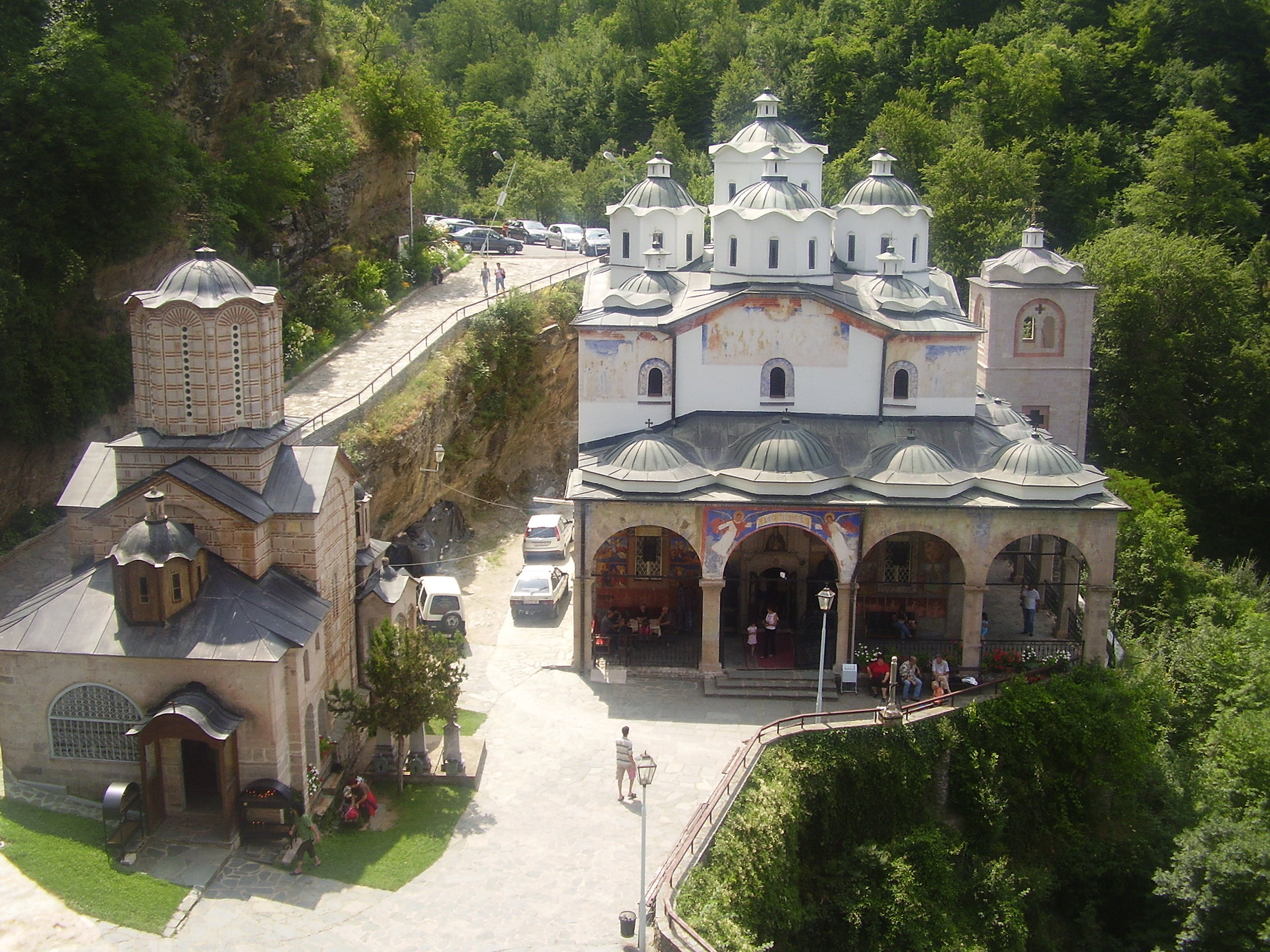
Osogovo Monastery near Kriva Palanka, North Macedonia, a work of Andrey Damyanov

Damyanov and his team (tayfa) travelled and worked throughout the Ottoman Balkans and his works can be found not only in modern-day North Macedonia, but in Serbia and Bosnia and Herzegovina as well. His oeuvre includes more than 40 buildings, most of them churches, notably the church of St. Panteleimon in Veles (1840), the monastery church of St. Joachim of Osogovo, near Kriva Palanka (1845), The Holy Mother of God in the village of Novo Selo near Štip (1850) and St. Nicholas in Kumanovo (1851) as well as his churches in Niš, Nova Crkva, Mostar, and Sarajevo (Cathedral of the Nativity of the Theotokos). Adapting to the social demand of its Serbian sponsors, Damyanov combined simultaneously traditional elements of the 15th century Morava architectural school with Occidental baroque elements found north of Sava river.

== Award ==
In his honor, in North Macedonia from December 28, 1989, the Andrey Damyanov Award is granted to an architect who contributed to the order and the development of Macedonian architecture.
