= Damião, Paraíba =

Coordinates: 6°37′55″S 35°54′36″W

Damião
- Municipality
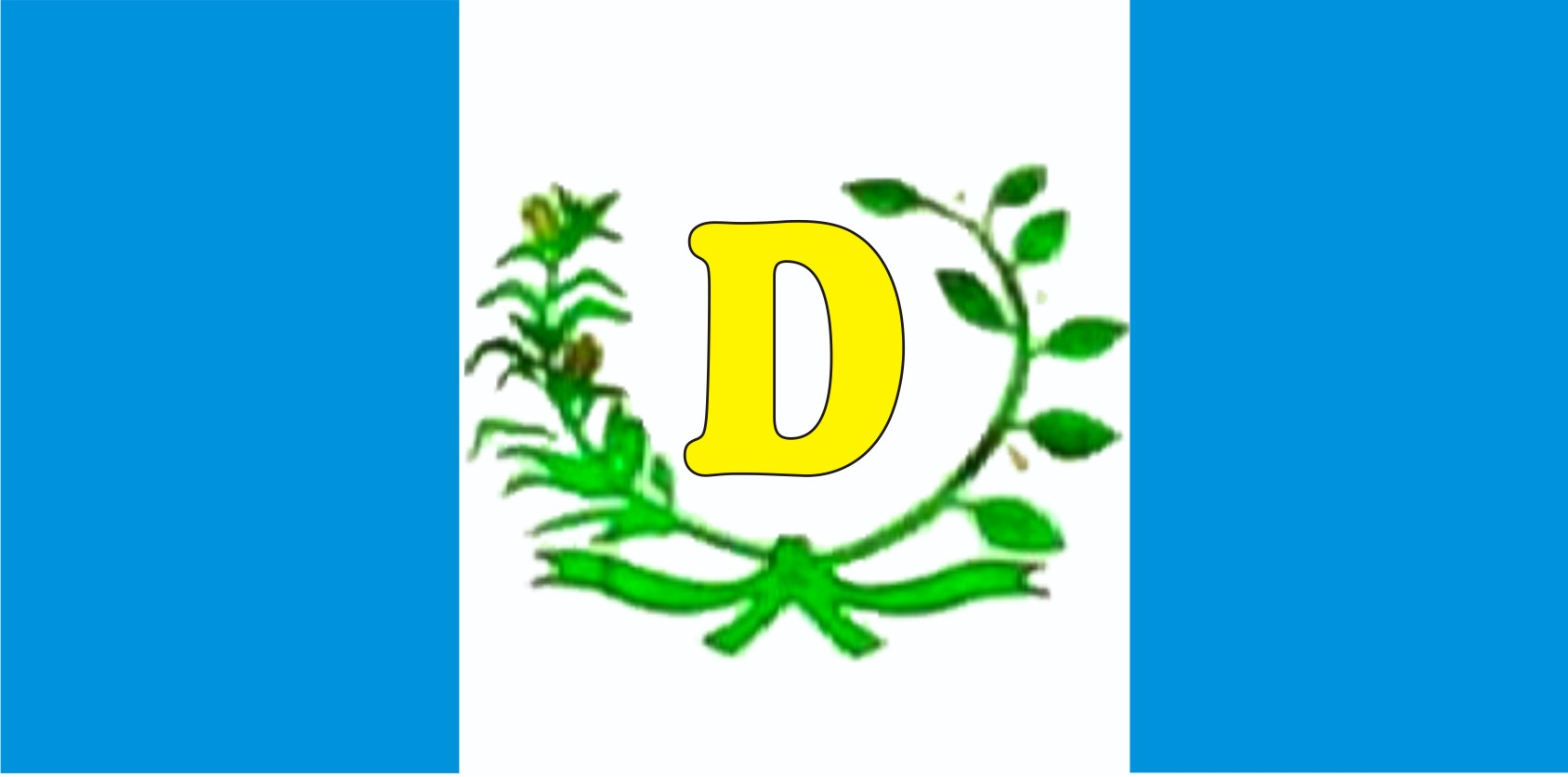
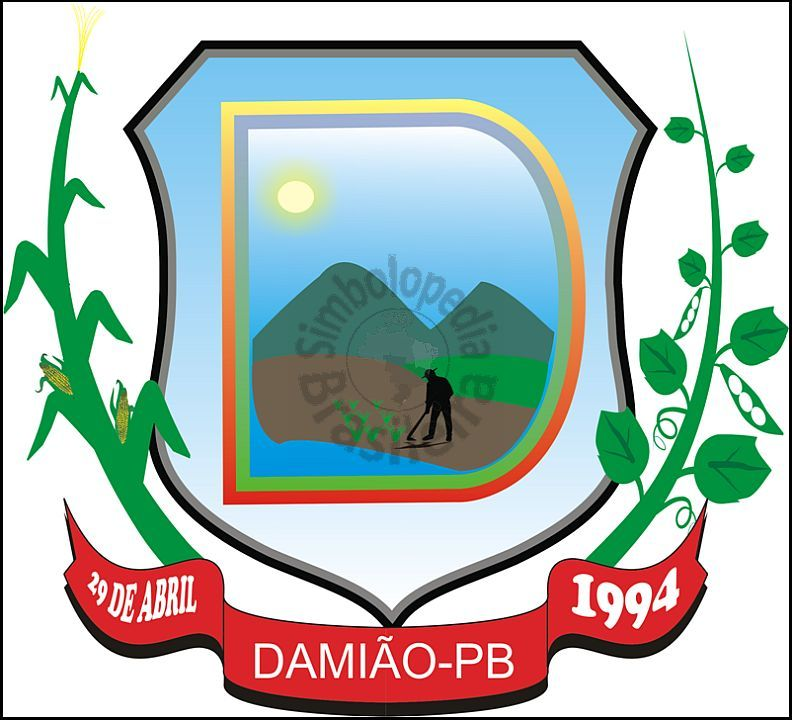
- Flag Coat of arms
- Interactive map of Damião
- Country: Brazil
- Region: Northeast
- State: Paraíba
- Mesoregion: Agreste Paraibano

Population (2020)
  - Total: 5,370
- Time zone: UTC−3 (BRT)

Damião (Central northeastern portuguese pronunciation: [dɐ̃mjˈɐ̃w]) is a municipality in the state of Paraíba in the Northeast Region of Brazil.

== See also ==
- List of municipalities in Paraíba
