= Damon of Thessalonica =

Damon of Thessalonica was a Macedonian statesman known from an inscription (143 BC) in Olympia, Elis, honouring Quintus Caecilius Metellus Macedonicus.

Damon son of Nicanor, Macedonian from Thessalonica for Quintus Caecilius son of Quintus Metellus, proconsul of the Romans, to the Olympian Zeus on account of his virtue (arete) and goodwill which he continues to manifest to myself and the homecity and the rest of Macedonians and the other Greeks

As Gene L. Green points out: This honorific inscription highlights the fact that not all Macedonians, especially those living in Thessalonica, viewed the Roman occupation as unbearable yoke but rather enjoyed the fruits of Roman benefaction. ... The benefits Metellus brought extended beyond arresting the rebellion of Andriscus. Pro-Roman attitudes appear over and again in inscriptions from Thessalonica, a city that appears to have been particularly favored by the Romans. ... The Thessalonians viewed Metellus as their savior from the insurrection of Andriscus, clear evidence that Thessalonica was one of the Macedonian cities that did not support but rather opposed the rebellion. The city's sympathies were with Metellus, who served as proconsul from 147 to 146 BC, and this support possibly resulted in the exemption from paying tribute to Rome and the grant of free-city status to Thessalonica.

== See also ==
- Fourth Macedonian War
- History of Thessaloniki#Roman_era
- Macedonia (Roman province)
