= Milan Damnjanović (physicist) =

Serbian professor of Quantum mechanics and Mathematical physics (born 1953)

Milan Damnjanović

Milan Damnjanović (Serbian Cyrillic: Милан Дамњановић) (born July 9, 1953), is a full professor specialising in Quantum mechanics and Mathematical physics at the Faculty of Physics at the University of Belgrade and Member of Serbian Academy of Sciences and Arts.
