= Damian (martyrs, February 12) =

Christian saint

Damian is the name of a Christian saint formerly included in the Roman Martyrology under 12 February. The saint was removed when the Martyrology was revised in 2004. It appears that two early martyrs—one a soldier killed in Alexandria or Roman Africa, the other one whose relics were found in the catacomb of Callixtus—were conflated at some point. The relics from the catacomb were later translated to Salamanca.
