= Damian Bartyla =

Polish lawyer and local politician

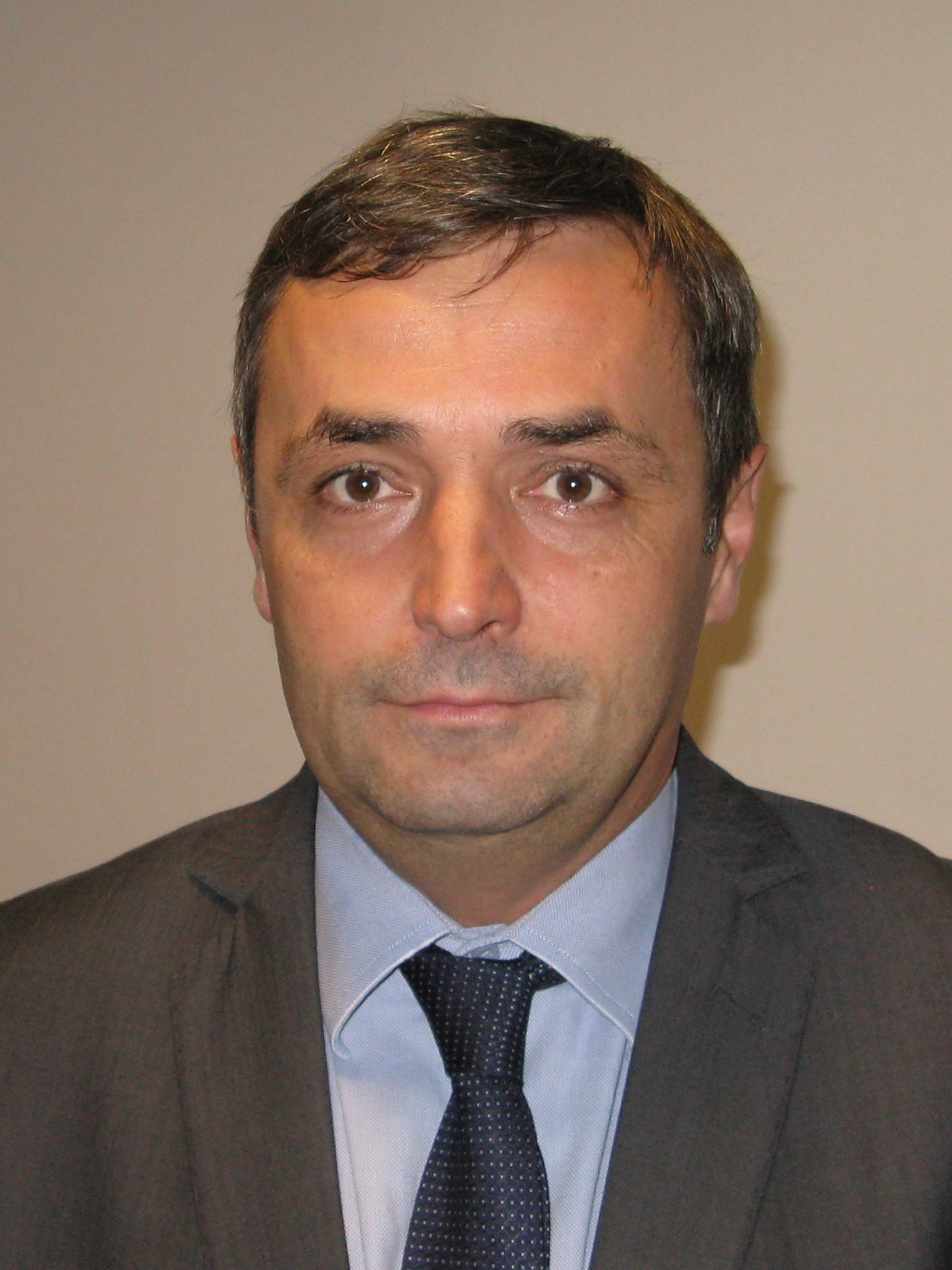

Mayor of Bytom
- In office 2012–2018
- Preceded by: Halina Bieda (Acting)
- Succeeded by: Mariusz Wołosz

Personal details
- Education: University of Silesia in Katowice

Damian Bartyla (born 3 April 1971 in Bytom) is a Polish lawyer and local politician who was the Mayor of Bytom 2012 to 2018.

He graduated from the University of Silesia in Katowice. Between 2002 and 2010, he was employed in the Bytom town hall. After two years of being deputy chairman of Polonia Bytom, he was promoted to the position of chairman in 2004.

In the 2010 local election, he unsuccessfully ran against the incumbent Mayor of Bytom, Piotr Koj, receiving 47,07% of votes in the second round.

In 2012, after a local referendum that dismissed Koj and the city council, Bartyla won the elections, having defeated Halina Bieda, then the Civic Platform candidate as well as the commissioner who acted both Mayor and the City Council.

In 2014 local election, he was reelected.
