= Kriva Palanka =

Kriva Palanka Крива Паланкa (Macedonian)
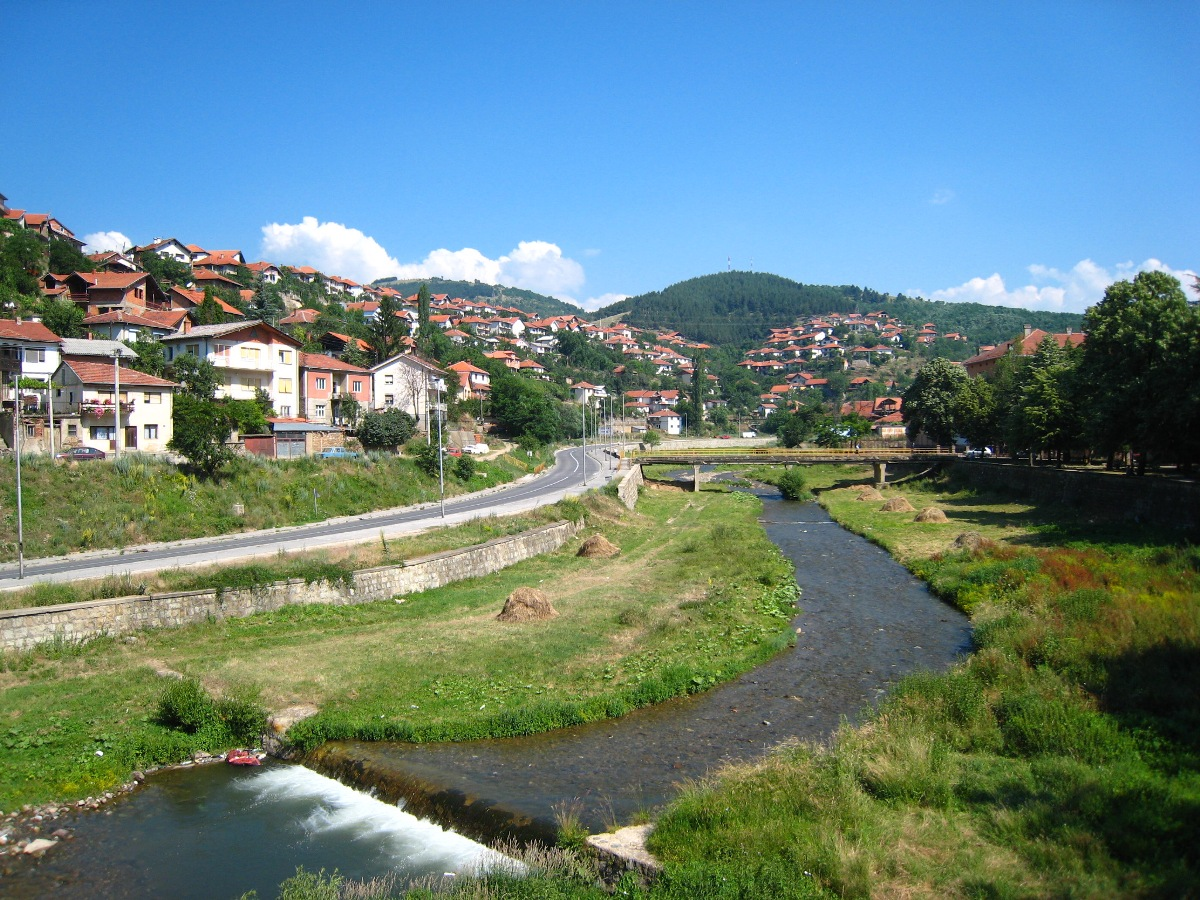
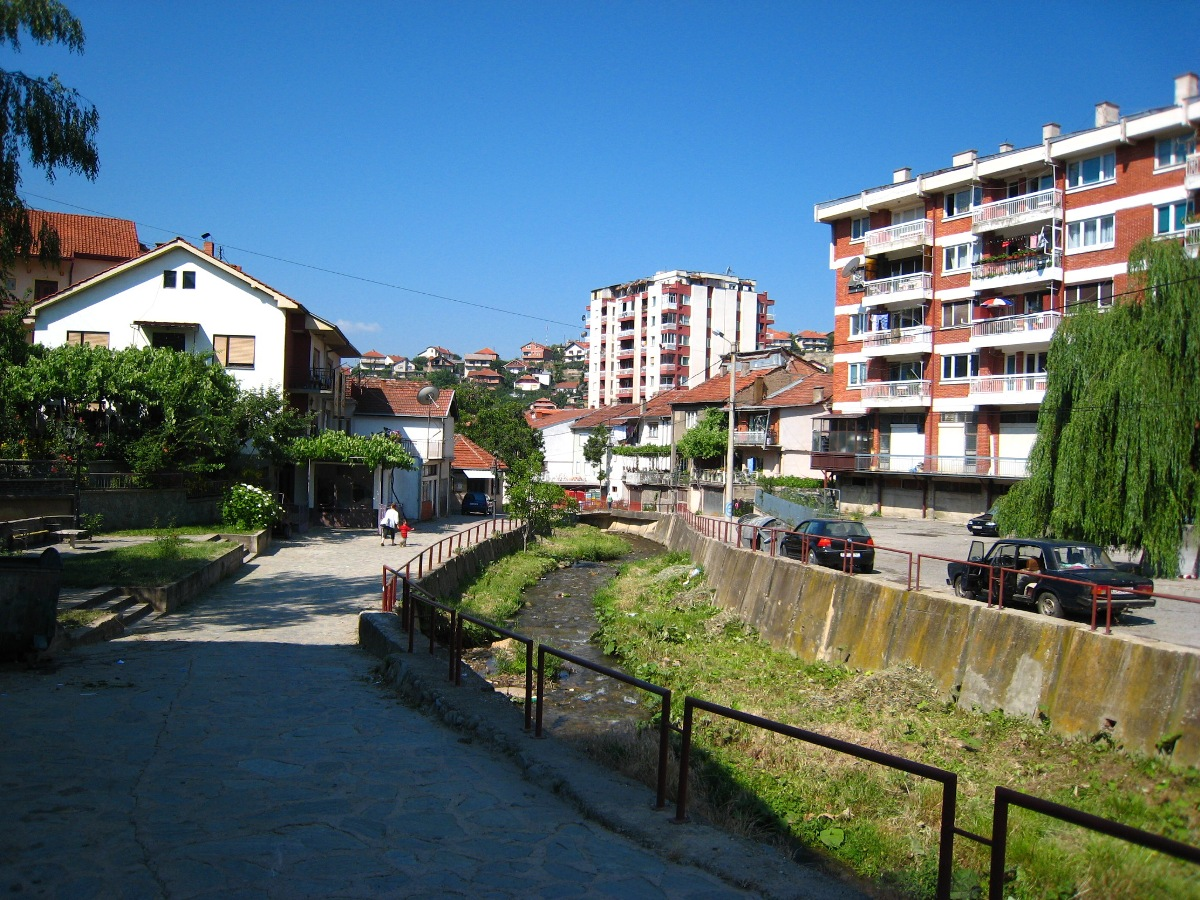
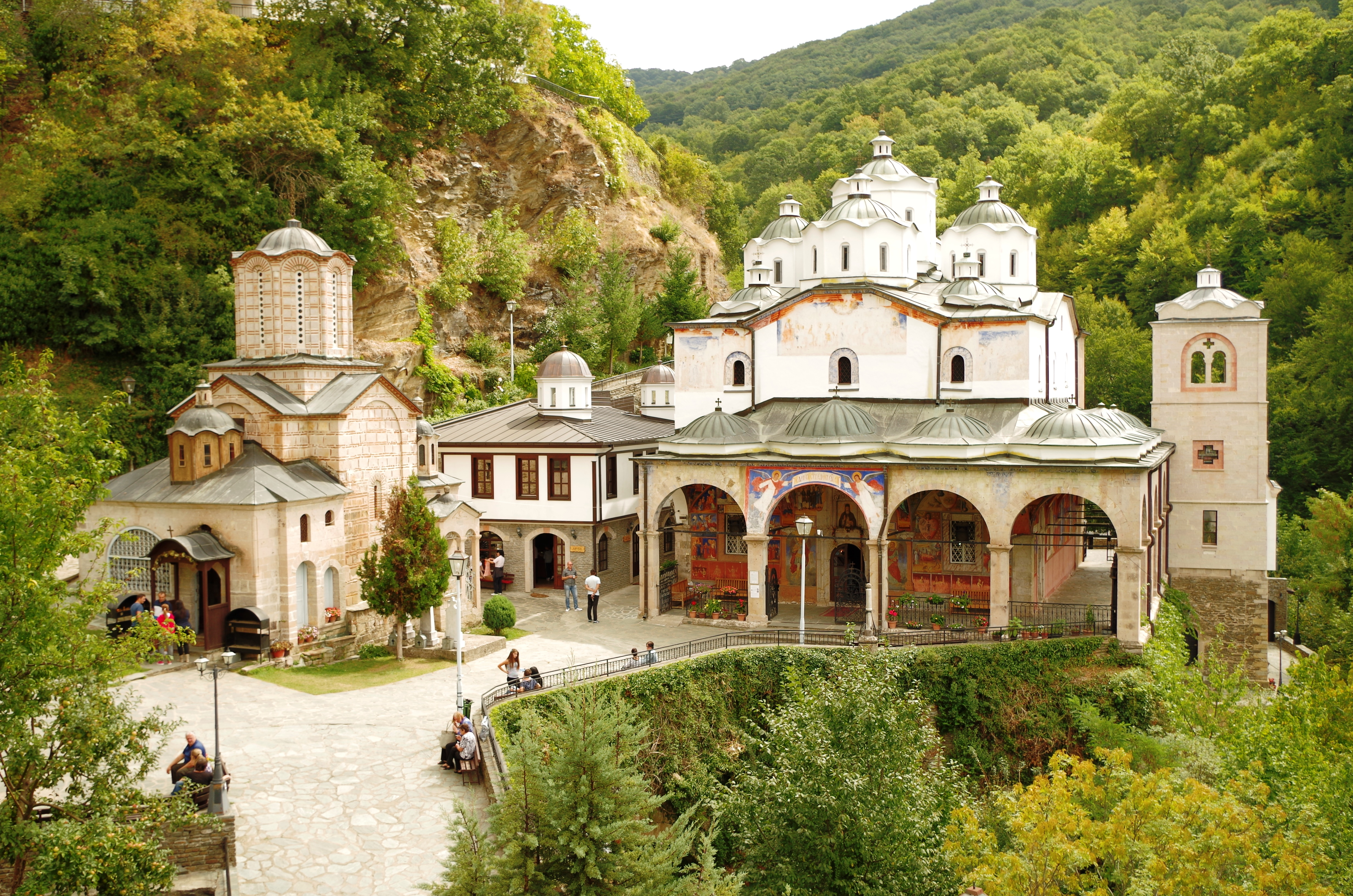
- From the top, Kriva River flowing through Kriva Palanka, Downtown Kriva Palanka, Osogovo Monastery

- Flag Coat of arms
- Nickname: Palanka
- Location within Macedonia
- Coordinates: 42°7′N 22°11′E
- Country: North Macedonia
- Region: Northeastern
- Municipality: Kriva Palanka

Government
  - Mayor: Sashko Mitovski (SDSM)
- Elevation: 620 m (2,030 ft)

Population (2021)
  - Total: 13,481
- Time zone: UTC+1 (CET)
  - Summer (DST): UTC+2 (CEST)
- Postal code: 1330
- Area code: +389 031
- Vehicle registration: KP
- Climate: Cfb
- Website: www.krivapalanka.gov.mk

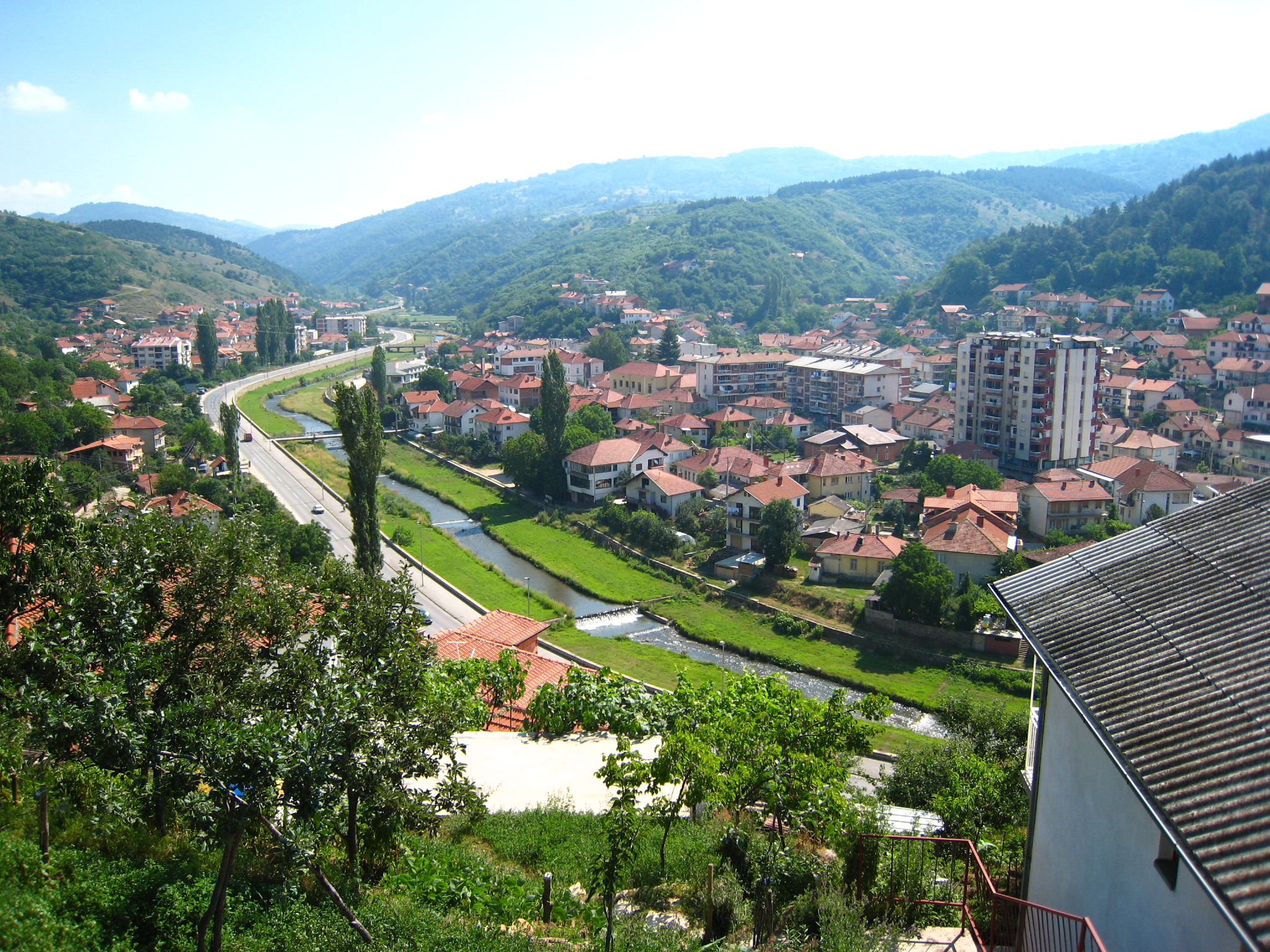
Kriva Palanka

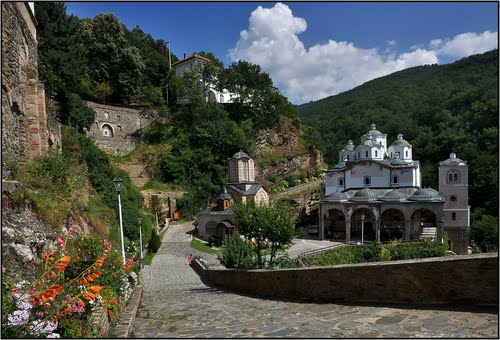
Monastery of Joakim Osogovski

Kriva Palanka (Macedonian: Крива Паланка [ˌkriːva ˈpalanka]) is a town located in the northeastern part of North Macedonia. It has 13,481 inhabitants. The town of Kriva Palanka is the seat of Kriva Palanka Municipality which has 18,059 inhabitants.

The town lies near the Deve Bair national border crossing with Bulgaria; as such, there is nearly constant heavy traffic passing through the main road which bisects the two sides of the town (Deve Bair is considered the main border crossing between North Macedonia and Bulgaria because it links the capitals Skopje with Sofia).

== Etymology ==
The name of the town derives from the curved riverbed of the river Kriva. The old name of Kriva Palanka was Egri Dere, in Turkish - "Curved River". The Turkish word dere was later substituted with Palanka. The word Palanka literally means town, a place bigger than a village but smaller than a city.

== Geography and climate ==
Kriva Palanka has a temperate continental climate with moderately cold winter, warm summer, and relatively warm autumn. The higher parts of the municipality on Osogovo mountain are affected by the alpine climate. The average annual temperature is 10.2 C. The warmest month is July with an average temperature of 20.0 C and the coldest month is January with an average temperature of -0.3 C. Compared to the surrounding region, the Kriva Palanka area gets significant rainfall. This is due to the high altitude setting, which stimulates orographic precipitation of moisture carried by the western and southern winds. The average date of first snow cover in the area is 30 November. The areas over 1700 meters above sea level have quite low mean annual temperatures, therefore the peaks of Ruen and Carev Vrv are under snow cover from October until early June. Ruen remains under snow even in July.

== History ==
The town is one of the youngest in North Macedonia. It was settled by Ottoman vizier Bayram Pasha and originally served as a fort to strengthen that region. The formation of the town is noted in Turkish documents from 1633. This includes a stone plate with Arabic encryption on the entrance of the fortress. The plate was later moved to the mosque which was situated in the center of the town and now is kept in the Museum of Macedonia in Skopje.

Its favorable position enabled this small settlement to become a larger town. There was a significant Christian influence in the town which led to the development and revival of the town in a Christian and orthodox manner. A class of rich and influential traders and artisans was formed who traveled outside the Ottoman Empire and brought new ideas of the 19th century to the city.

During this period, Yoakim Karchovski with the help of the local traders in 1814-1819, printed five famous books in Buda in a lively folk speech. Yoakim not only addressed the need for literacy, but had a crucial role in the establishment of the church - cell school in 1817, which was placed in Enger's house, in which vicinity later with great efforts by the city aristocrats and the donor David Jerej, in 1833 the church of St. Dimitrija would be built.

As a result of church-educational activity in Kriva Palanka, as early as 1833 functions the epitropic — church community, which in 1861 was transformed into a Bulgarian Exarchate church — school community, and already the same year will be self-governed without renouncement of the Skopje Patriarchal metropolitan.

From 1877 to 1912, Kriva Palanka was part of the Kosovo Vilayet of the Ottoman Empire while after the Balkan Wars it became part of the Kingdom of Serbia.

After the First World War in 1919-1920 when Kriva Palanka for the first time obtained the status of municipality as part of the Vardar Banovina of the Kingdom of Serbs, Croats and Slovenes, the town received its first native president (mayor) and its physical appearance, which has mostly been maintained as it is today. In that time Kriva Palanka became richer with a few significant facilities: The Municipal Building, The Officer's House, primary school Partizan, the old Hospital, and the first regulation of the riverbed of Kriva Reka from Osichka Maala to Numulija. In addition, the construction of the first power plant in North-East Macedonia began on the river Durachka, but the construction was stopped later on.

From 1941 to 1944, during the Axis occupation of Yugoslavia, Kriva Palanka, as most of Vardar Macedonia was annexed by the Kingdom of Bulgaria.

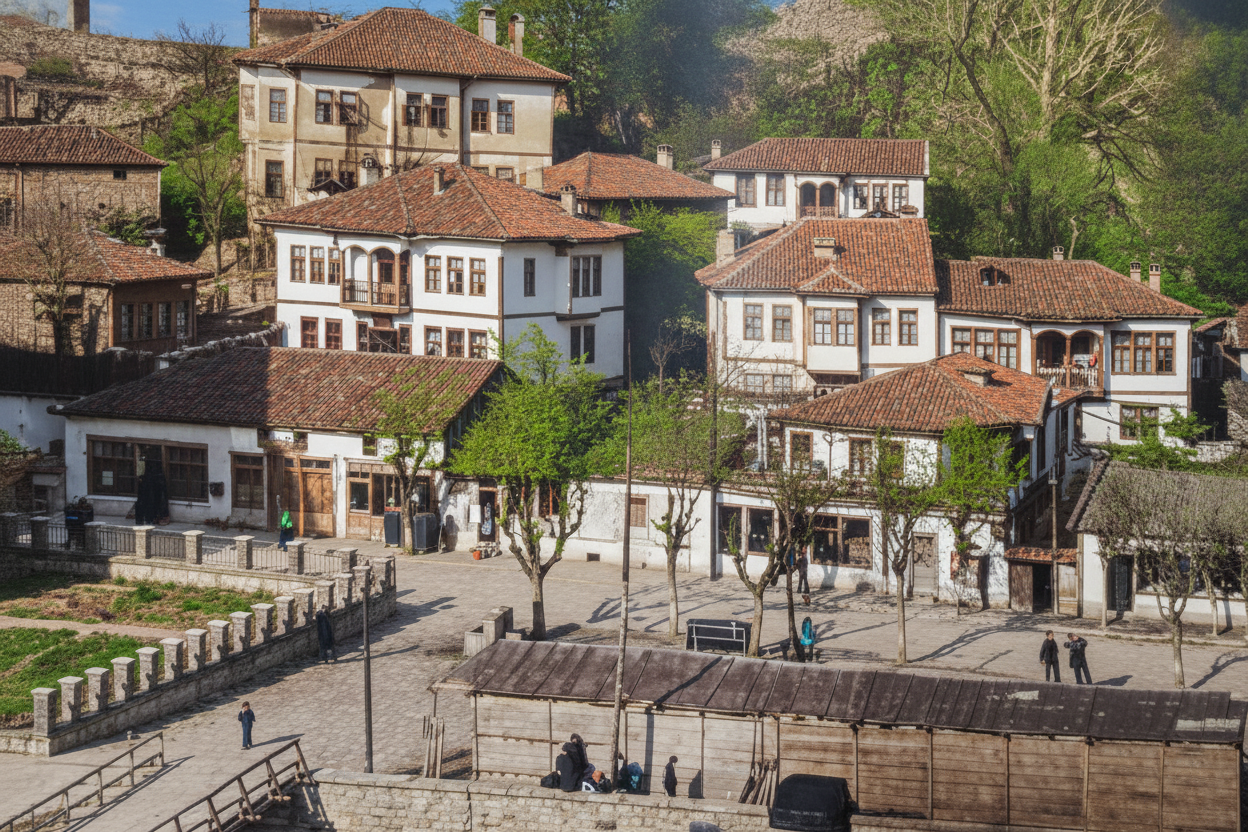
Kriva Palanka after WW1

== Population ==
	2021	
	Number	%
TOTAL	14,450	100
Macedonians	13,758	95.2
Roma	560	3.88
Serbs	88	0.61
others	44	0.03

The city has a favorable demographic picture with population growth. Notable is the high birthrate among the Macedonians, given that in the city and several surrounding villages, many families of Macedonian nationality live with 4 or more children.

== Religion ==
The population of Kriva Palanka is mostly of the Orthodox faith. Orthodoxy is deeply entered into the life and traditions of the citizens of Kriva Palanka for which testify the large number of churches and monasteries that are located in the city and in the immediate vicinity. Kriva Palanka is well known in North Macedonia for one of the most beautiful monastery complexes, the monastery of Saint Joachim Osogovski.

== Economy ==
Economically, trade is most developed in Kriva Palanka due to the proximity to the Bulgarian border, and the rest are engaged in agriculture (mostly cultivated potato, to a lesser extent corn, wheat, barley, rye, oats, etc..), then mining is also important with the nearby mines Toranica (lead and zinc) and Bentomak. In the center of Kriva Palanka there are several traditional craft stores that are still actively working. There are also grocery stores, and on the hills near the town there are many sawmills and cutmills for firewood and furniture.

== Education ==
There are several kindergartens, three primary schools and a high school.
