= Henryk Bartyla =

Polish footballer

Personal information
- Date of birth: 17 June 1925
- Place of birth: Zabrze, Poland
- Date of death: February 2001 (aged 75)
- Height: 1.80 m (5 ft 11 in)
- Position: Defender

Senior career*
Years	Team	Apps	(Gls)
1938–1958	Ruch Chorzów	168	(6)
1958–1959	Walcownia Czechowice		
1959–1961	Naprzód Lipiny		

International career
1952–1955	Poland	7	(0)

Managerial career
- 1959–1961: Naprzód Lipiny (player-manager)
- 1967: Warta Zawiercie
- * Club domestic league appearances and goals

Henryk Bartyla (17 June 1925 – February 2001) was a Polish footballer who played as a defender. He played in seven matches for the Poland national football team from 1952 to 1955.

== Honours ==
Ruch Chorzów

- Ekstraklasa: 1951, 1952, 1953
- Polish Cup: 1951
