= Velin Damyanov =

Bulgarian footballer

Personal information
- Full name: Velin Mitkov Damyanov
- Date of birth: 8 August 1988 (age 38)
- Place of birth: Burgas, Bulgaria
- Height: 1.97 m (6 ft 5 1/2 in)
- Position: Centre-back

Team information
- Current team: AP FFK Warsaw
- Number: 6

Youth career
- Naftex Burgas

Senior career*
Years	Team	Apps	(Gls)
2006–2009	Naftex Burgas	45	(5)
2009	Chernomorets Pomorie	13	(0)
2010–2012	Chernomorets Burgas	3	(0)
2010–2012	→ Chernomorets Pomorie (loan)	4	(0)
2012–2013	Neftochimic 1986	5	(1)
2013–2015	Chrobry Głogów	15	(1)
2015–2016	Pogoń Grodzisk Mazowiecki	19	(1)
2023–	AP FFK Warsaw	31	(8)
- * Club domestic league appearances and goals as of 17:12, 24 June 2025 (UTC)

Velin Mitkov Damyanov (Bulgarian: Велин Митков Дамянов, born 8 August 1988) is a Bulgarian footballer who plays as a centre-back for Polish Klasa A club AP FFK Warsaw.

== Honours ==
Chrobry Głogów

- II liga West: 2013–14
