= Damon Tweedy =

American physician and academic

Damon Scott Tweedy
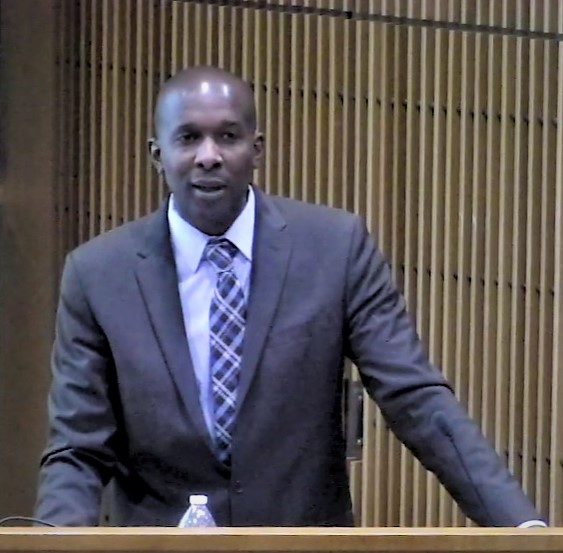
- Tweedy in 2019
- Education: University of Maryland, Baltimore County; Duke University School of Medicine; Yale University
- Scientific career
- Workplaces: Duke University School of Medicine

Damon Scott Tweedy is an American physician who is an associate professor of psychiatry and behavioral sciences at the Duke University School of Medicine. In 2015 Tweedy published his memoir, Black Man in a White Coat: A Doctor's Reflections on Race and Medicine. In 2024 he published another book Facing the Unseen: The Struggle to Center Mental Health in Medicine.

== Early life and education ==
Tweedy was born into a socially conservative family. He was an undergraduate student at the University of Maryland, Baltimore County where he played UMBC Retrievers men's basketball. Tweedy was a student at the Duke University School of Medicine in the mid-1990s, and experienced racism as commonplace in society and medicine. As a medical student, Tweedy was mistaken by a professor for a caretaker. He has said that he was worried that he was a product of affirmative action. In 2000 he graduated from Duke University. After graduating in medicine, Tweedy moved to Yale University, where he studied law.

== Research and career ==
Tweedy was appointed associate professor of psychiatry at the Duke University. He has argued that to address racial inequalities in healthcare, America needs more African American doctors. He attributes the inequity in outcomes to mistrust of African-American people in their majority white doctors, and the mistrust of physicians in their African-American patients. This influences the demographics of patients who take part in clinical studies, which lessens the impact of medical research. He has investigated the history of segregation at Duke University.

== Book ==
In 2015 Tweedy published his memoir, Black Man in a White Coat: A Doctor's Reflections on Race and Medicine, which explores race and its interactions with medicine. The book was well received by critics. The British Medical Journal admired "Tweedy's unflinching honesty and fierce introspection." Black Man in a White Coat was selected as one of the Top 10 Nonfiction Books by Time magazine. It was also recommended reading by Oprah's Book Club and Entertainment Weekly.

== Selected publications ==
- Blumenthal, James; Sherwood, Andrew; Elizabeth C. D. Gullette; Babyak, Michael Alan; Robert Waugh; Anastasia Georgiades; Linda W. Craighead; Tweedy, Damon Scott; Mark Feinglos; Mark Appelbaum; Junichiro Hayano; Alan Hinderliter (2000). "Exercise and weight loss reduce blood pressure in men and women with mild hypertension: effects on cardiovascular, metabolic, and hemodynamic functioning". JAMA Internal Medicine. 160 (13): 1947–1958. doi:10.1001/archinte.160.13.1947. PMID 10888969. Wikidata Q47235163.
- Anastasia Georgiades; Sherwood, Andrew; Elizabeth C. D. Gullette; Babyak, Michael Alan; Alan Hinderliter; Robert Waugh; Tweedy, Damon Scott; Linda Craighead; Richard Bloomer; Blumenthal, James (2000). "Effects of exercise and weight loss on mental stress-induced cardiovascular responses in individuals with high blood pressure". Hypertension. 36 (2): 171–176. doi:10.1161/01.hyp.36.2.171. PMID 10948073. Wikidata Q47231549.
- Blumenthal, James; Sherwood, Andrew; Elizabeth C D Gullette; Anastasia Georgiades; Tweedy, Damon Scott (2002). "Biobehavioral approaches to the treatment of essential hypertension". Journal of Consulting and Clinical Psychology. 70 (3): 569–589. doi:10.1037/0022-006x.70.3.569. PMID 12090370. Wikidata Q34713711.
