= Damjan (given name) =

Damjan (Serbian: Дамјан) may refer to:

- Damjan Bohar (born 1991), Slovenian footballer
- Damjan Daničić (born 2000), Serbian footballer
- Damjan Đoković (born 1990), Croatian footballer who also holds Dutch citizenship
- Damjan Dostanić (born 2001), Serbian footballer
- Damjan Fras (born 1973), Slovenian ski jumper
- Damjan Gajser (born 1975), Slovenian football midfielder
- Damjan Gojkov (born 1998), Serbian footballer
- Damjan Knežević (born 2000), Serbian footballer
- Damjan Kozole (born 1964), Slovenian film director
- Damjan Ljubibratić (fl. 1596–1614), Serbian Orthodox monk and diplomat
- Damjan Ošlaj (born 1976), football defender
- Damjan Ostojič (born 1986), Slovenian figure skater
- Damjan Pavlović (born 2001), Serbian footballer
- Damjan Pejčinoski (born 1984), Macedonian guitarist
- Damjan Petek (born 1973), Slovenian judoka
- Damjan Prelovšek (born 1945), Yugoslav slalom canoeist who competed in the early 1970s
- Damjan Rudež (born 1986), Croatian basketball player
- Damjan Shishkovski (born 1995), Macedonian footballer
- Damjan Sitar (born 1981), Slovenian decathlete
- Damjan Stojanovski (born 1987), Macedonian basketball player
- Damjan Štrbac (1917–1941), Serbian Orthodox priest and saint
- Damjan Trifković (born 1987), Slovenian footballer
- Damjan Vuklišević (born 1995), Slovenian footballer
- Damjan Zlatnar (born 1977), Slovenian hurdler
