= Halina Bieda =

Polish politician (born 1962)

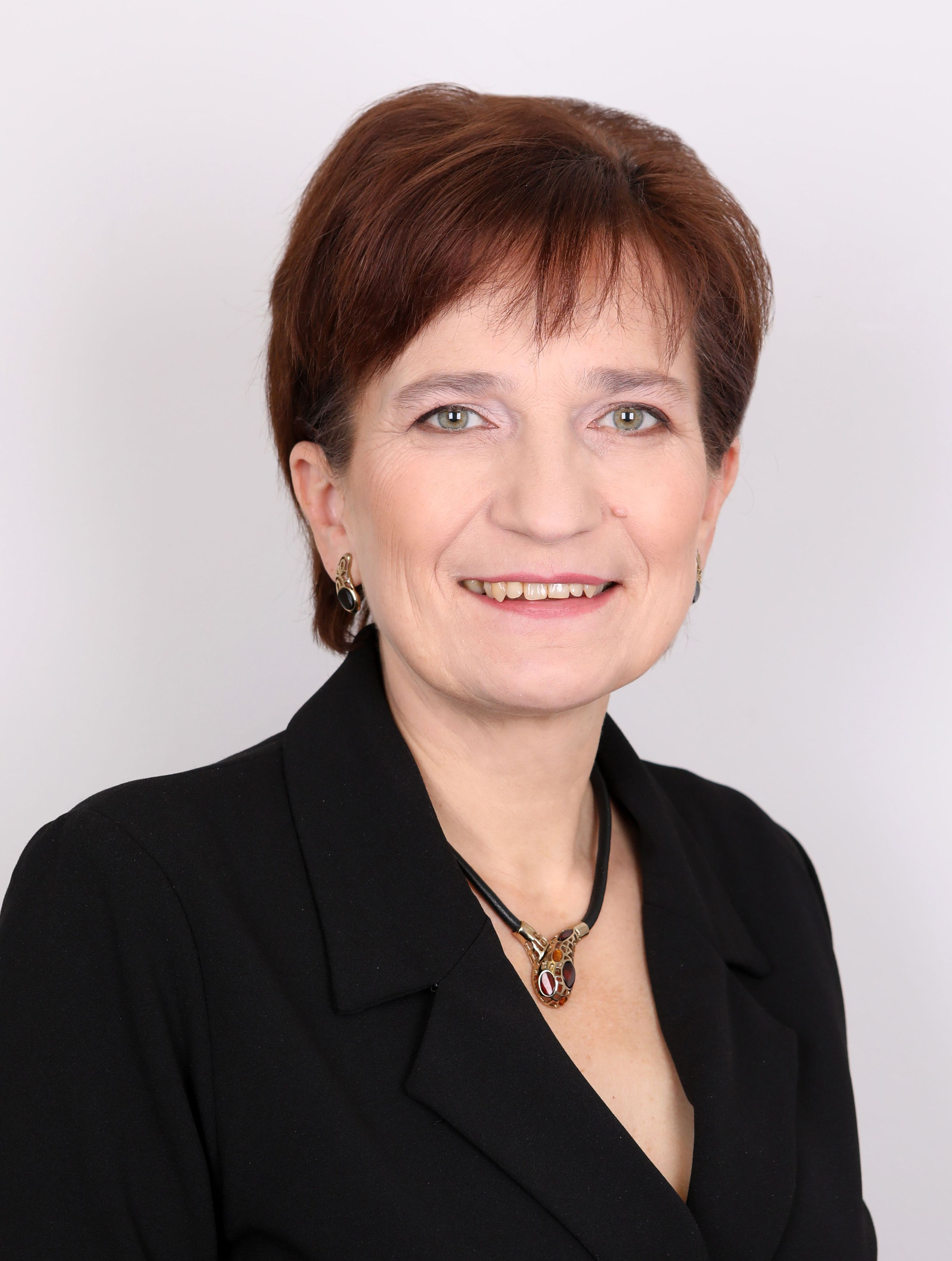

Member of the Senate of Poland

Personal details
- Born: 6 October 1962 (age 63) Chorzów, Poland

Halina Maria Bieda (born 6 October 1962 in Chorzów) is a Polish politician. She was elected to the Senate of Poland (10th term) representing the constituency of Katowice. She was also elected to the 11th term.
