= Kingston University =

Public university in London, England

Kingston University London
- Coat of arms of the university
- Motto: Latin: Per Scientiam Progredimur
- Motto in English: "Through Learning We Progress"
- Type: Public
- Established: 1992 – gained University Status; 1899 – Kingston Technical Institute
- Academic affiliations: ACU; University Alliance; EUA; Universities UK; Defence Universities Alliance
- Endowment: £2.3 million (2022)
- Budget: £218.7 million (2021-22)
- Vice-Chancellor: Steven Spier
- Students: 18,815 (2024/25)
- Undergraduates: 14,805 (2024/25)
- Postgraduates: 4,010 (2024/25)
- Location: Penrhyn Road, Kingston upon Thames, London KT1 2EE, United Kingdom; 51.4035°N 0.3039°W
- Campus: Urban
- Colours: Blue and White
- Website: kingston.ac.uk

Kingston University London is a public research university located within the Royal Borough of Kingston upon Thames, in South West London, England. Its roots go back to the Kingston Technical Institute, founded in 1899. It received university status in 1992, before which the institution was known as Kingston Polytechnic.

Kingston has around 17,000 students and a turnover of £192 million. It has four campuses situated in Kingston and Roehampton. The university specialises in the arts, design, fashion, science, engineering, and business and is organised into four faculties: Kingston School of Art, Faculty of Business and Social Sciences (which combines Kingston Business School and the School of Law, Social and Behavioural Sciences), Faculty of Health, Science, Social Care and Education, and Faculty of Engineering, Computing and the Environment. The Kingston Business School is CNAA MBA degree approved. In 2017, the university won The Guardian University Award for teaching excellence. Kingston is a member of the European University Association, the Association of Commonwealth Universities, and University Alliance group.

== History ==
Kingston was founded as Kingston Technical Institute in 1899, it offered courses in chemistry, electrical wiring, construction and nursing. In 1917 Gipsy Hill College for teacher training opened, a predecessor of Kingston University. Gipsy Hill College was created by Belle Rennie and led by an Australian named Lillian Daphne de Lissa. In 1930 the Kingston School of Art separated from the Technical Institute, later to become Kingston College of Art in 1945. In 1946 Gipsy Hill College moved to Kingston Hill. In 1951, the first Penrhyn Road campus buildings opened. Kingston was recognised as a 'Regional College of Technology' by the Ministry of Education in 1957. In 1970, the College of Technology merged with the College of Art to become Kingston Polytechnic, offering 34 major courses, of which 17 were at degree level. In 1975, Kingston merged with the Gipsy Hill College of Education, incorporating the college's faculty into Kingston's Division of Educational Studies.

Kingston was granted university status under the Further and Higher Education Act 1992. In 1993, Kingston opened the Roehampton Vale campus building and in 1995, Kingston acquired Dorich House.

In June 2021, Kingston launched its Future Skills campaign, highlighting the importance of skills for innovation and the vital role they play in driving a thriving UK economy. The results of their 2021 and 2022 surveys, conducted with support from YouGov, demonstrated key attributes such as problem-solving, critical thinking, communication, adaptability and creativity remain among the core skills most valued by employers.

== Campuses and estate ==
=== Penrhyn Road ===
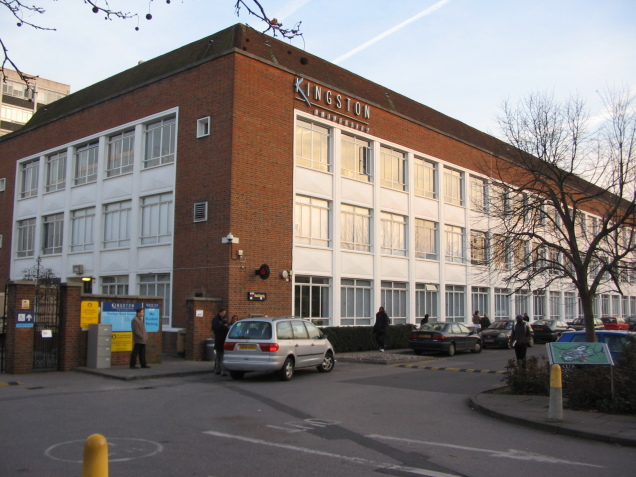
Main building, Penrhyn Road campus

This is the main university campus located close to Kingston town centre. Students based here study Arts and Social Sciences, Civil Engineering, Computing and Information Systems and Mathematics, Earth Sciences and Geography, Statistics, Biosciences, Pharmacy, Chemistry and Pharmaceutical Science, and Radiography. Development at this site has extended to the Learning Resources Centre. In 2015, the Union of Kingston Students, moved into the main building. Penrhyn Road also houses the refurbished Fitness Centre.

==== Town House ====
Kingston University's Town House building was opened in January 2020 and is located on the Penrhyn Road campus. The six-storey building was the first by Royal Institute of British Architects (RIBA) Gold Medal-winning firm Grafton Architects in the United Kingdom and is open to students, staff and the local community.

The building work was carried out by Hertfordshire-based Willmott Dixon. It features a three-floor academic library, archive, dance studios and a studio theatre. It incorporates a covered internal courtyard, two cafes and external balconies and walkways culminating in a rooftop garden with views across Kingston upon Thames and the River Thames.

Town House has been nominated for several awards, including two The Guardian University Awards, and a RIBA London Regional Award. In October 2021, Town House was announced as the winner of the 25th RIBA Stirling Prize. In 2022 it won the European Union Prize for Contemporary Architecture.

=== Kingston Hill ===
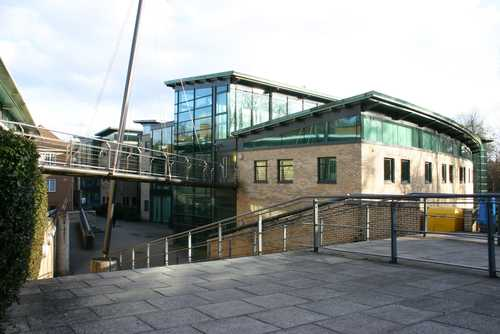
Kingston Hill campus, Kingston University

Kingston Hill mainly caters to Nursing (adult, child, mental health and learning disability), Education, Business, Music and Social Care. Before 1989, this campus was known as Gipsy Hill.

The Business School moved to a new building on the Kingston Hill Campus in 2012.

=== Knights Park ===
Located on Grange Road, the Knights Park campus is home to some of the students from Kingston School of Art (KSA) - architecture, art and design students. The campus is built on the northern banks of the Hogsmill River and opened in 1939.

A £29 million refurbishment of the Mill Street workshops, studios and reception area, was completed in March 2020 and includes a gallery, a social space and an art shop. The regeneration project was shortlisted for a Royal Institute of British Architects (RIBA) London Regional Award.

=== Roehampton Vale ===
The Roehampton Vale campus was opened in 1993 by Sir William Barlow, the president of the Royal Academy of Engineering. The site is located on Friars Avenue, on the outskirts of Kingston. This campus is purpose-built and completely dedicated to the study of engineering (aerospace, automotive, motor vehicle and mechanical engineering).

Facilities on site include a wind tunnel, engineering workshops, a flight simulator, a range of vehicles, a Learjet 25 plane, several large 3D printers, plus automotive and aeronautical learning resources.

=== Reg Bailey Theatre Complex ===
Former church converted into the Kingston Drama students' base, the Reg Bailey has two theatres with lighting and sound equipment, three rehearsal rooms and a costume room while its annexed Surrey Club is for Dance students. The Reg Bailey has been home to such alumni members as Ben Barnes, Sam Chan, Mandy Takhar, Alphonsia Emmanuel, Jessie Cave, Laura Harling and Trevor Eve.

=== Tolworth Court Sports Ground ===
The university's 55-acre sports ground houses twelve football pitches, two rugby pitches, three cricket squares, one American football pitch, one lacrosse pitch, two netball courts and three tennis courts.

=== Galleries and museums ===
The Stanley Picker Gallery is the Faculty's exhibition space which is now used to present a variety of research-based projects, fellowships and exhibitions. In 2003, the Stanley Picker Gallery gave birth to Transitstation, which was created/curated by Stanley Picker Fellow Dagmar Glausnitzer-Smith, and former gallery curator Charles Ryder. In 2003, the Director of Foundation Studies in Art and Design, Paul Stafford, converted a run-down public convenience in Kingston town centre into the Toilet Gallery.

Kingston University runs Dorich House Museum which houses a huge collection of sculptor Dora Gordine's work, and examples of Russian Imperial art and furniture. Dorich House is also used as a meeting and conference venue.

=== Other locations ===
Additional to the four main campuses is an administration building: Hind Court on London Road which was home to the office of the Vice-Chancellor until 2018 when they moved to Holmwood House.

Furthermore, art and design studies students from Kingston School of Art are based at River House, on the High Street in Kingston town centre.

== Organisation ==
Teaching and research are organised in four faculties.

=== Kingston School of Art ===
Kingston School of Art (KSA) was established as part of Kingston Technical Institute founded in 1899. The School of Art separated from the Technical College in 1930 and left Kingston Hall Road to move to Knights Park in 1939. It became Kingston College of Art in 1945 and merged back with the Technical College to form Kingston Polytechnic in 1970. The Polytechnic later became Kingston University in 1992, under which the school was known as the Faculty of Art, Design and Architecture (FADA) until 2017 when it reverted to its historic name. Kingston School of Art delivers undergraduate and postgraduate programmes of study across three schools:

The Kingston School of Art runs a number of research centres:

- Contemporary Art Research Centre ("CARC"), a Research Centre within the Department of Fine Art
- Colour Design Research Centre
- Screen Design Research Centre
- Modern Interiors Research Design
- Sustainable Design Research Centre
- Centre for the Contemporary Visual & Material Culture
- Curating Contemporary Design Research Group
- Real Estate Research Group
- Fashion Industry Research Centre
- Fire, Explosion and Fluid Dynamics (FEFD)
- Centre for Research in Modern European Philosophy (CRMEP)

=== Faculty of Business and Social Sciences ===
The Faculty of Business and Social Sciences combines Kingston Business School and the School of Law, Social and Behavioural Sciences.

Kingston Business School (KBS) can be traced back to the 1960s. In 1985, the CNAA approved the school's Master of Business Administration (MBA) degree and the following year KBS moved to Kingston Hill Campus. The Business School is divided into four departments:

=== Faculty of Health, Science, Social Care and Education ===
The Faculty of Health, Science, Social Care and Education was founded in August 2022 and contains courses including nursing, midwifery, social work and teacher training education. The faculty also contains life sciences and chemistry and pharmacy courses, which were previously part of Kingston's former Faculty of Science, Engineering and Computing – now the Faculty of Engineering, Computing and the Environment.

The new Faculty of Health, Science, Social Care and Education was established after a formal partnership between Kingston University and St George's, University of London (SGUL) was mutually terminated in July 2022 after 26 years of working together training the next generation of healthcare workers, social workers and teachers. The faculty is based at the University's Kingston Hill and Penrhyn Road campuses in Kingston upon Thames.

=== Faculty of Engineering, Computing and the Environment ===
The Faculty of Engineering, Computing and the Environment was founded in August 2022 and contains courses including mechanical, civil and aerospace engineering, computing, cyber security, quantity surveying and geography. The faculty is based at the University's Penrhyn Road and Roehampton Vale campuses.

== Academic profile ==
=== Rankings and reputation ===
Rankings
National rankings
- Complete (2027): 88
- Guardian (2027): 62
- Times / Sunday Times (2027): 78=

Global rankings
- QS (2027): 686=
- THE (2026): 801–1000

The Guardian placed Kingston 45th out of 128 surveyed universities. The Times/The Sunday Times Guide placed it at no. 92 (Good University Guide, 2022). In 2018, Kingston was ranked 1st out of 121 institutions for its graphic design and product design courses by The Guardian in 2017. In 2017, Kingston University won The Guardian University Award for teaching excellence.

Kingston is ranked as one of the top 40 universities in the UK by The Guardian University Guide 2020, ranked in the top 250 in the world for Business & Economics by the Times Higher Education World University Rankings 2019 and ranked in the top 140 Global MBA rank according to "QS World University Rankings" (2020) Kingston was awarded a Gold rating in the Teaching Excellence Framework (TEF) in September 2023. It has also secured a Gold award in the framework's two new student experience and student outcomes categories. The announcement sees Kingston join an elite line up of 26 universities and colleges across the United Kingdom who have been awarded TEF Gold in all three categories, alongside Oxford, Cambridge, Exeter and Warwick.

== Student life ==
=== Union of Kingston Students ===
The Union of Kingston Students (UKS), formerly Kingston University Students' Union (KUSU), and in the 1990s KUGOS (Kingston University Guild of Students') is a charitable organisation representing the student body and aiming to provide services and activities beneficial to the student experience. It is a student union in the meaning of the term given in the Education Act 1994, and whilst independent of the university is funded by a block grant from it.

=== Halls of residence ===
The university has six halls of residence. Chancellors' and Walkden are based at the Kingston Hill campus. Middle Mill is adjacent to the Knights Park campus, while Clayhill and Seething Wells are on opposite sides of Surbiton. Finally, there is Kingston Bridge House which is situated on the edge of Bushy Park at the Hampton Wick end of Kingston Bridge, London.

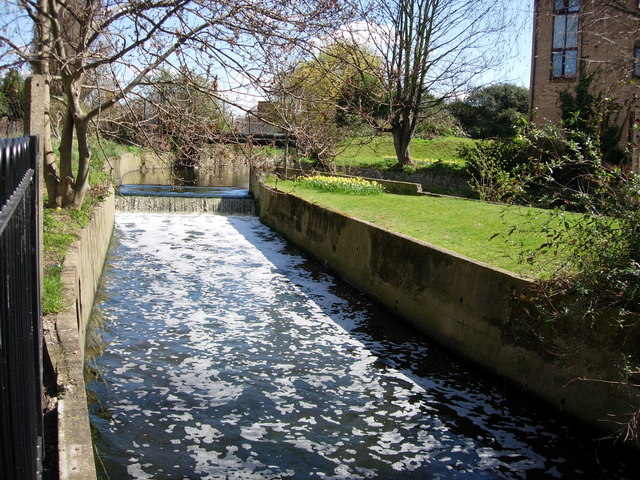
Hogsmill River

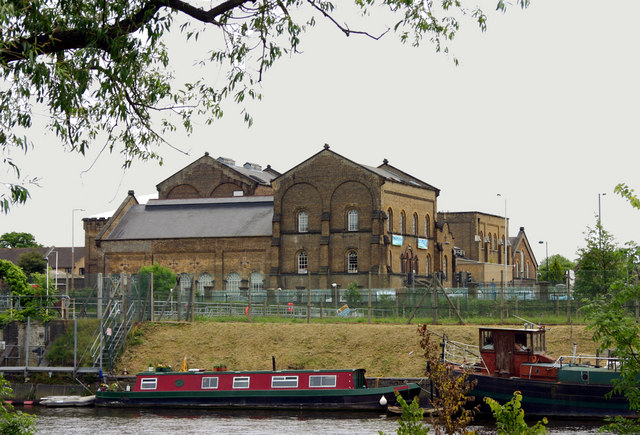
Seething Wells

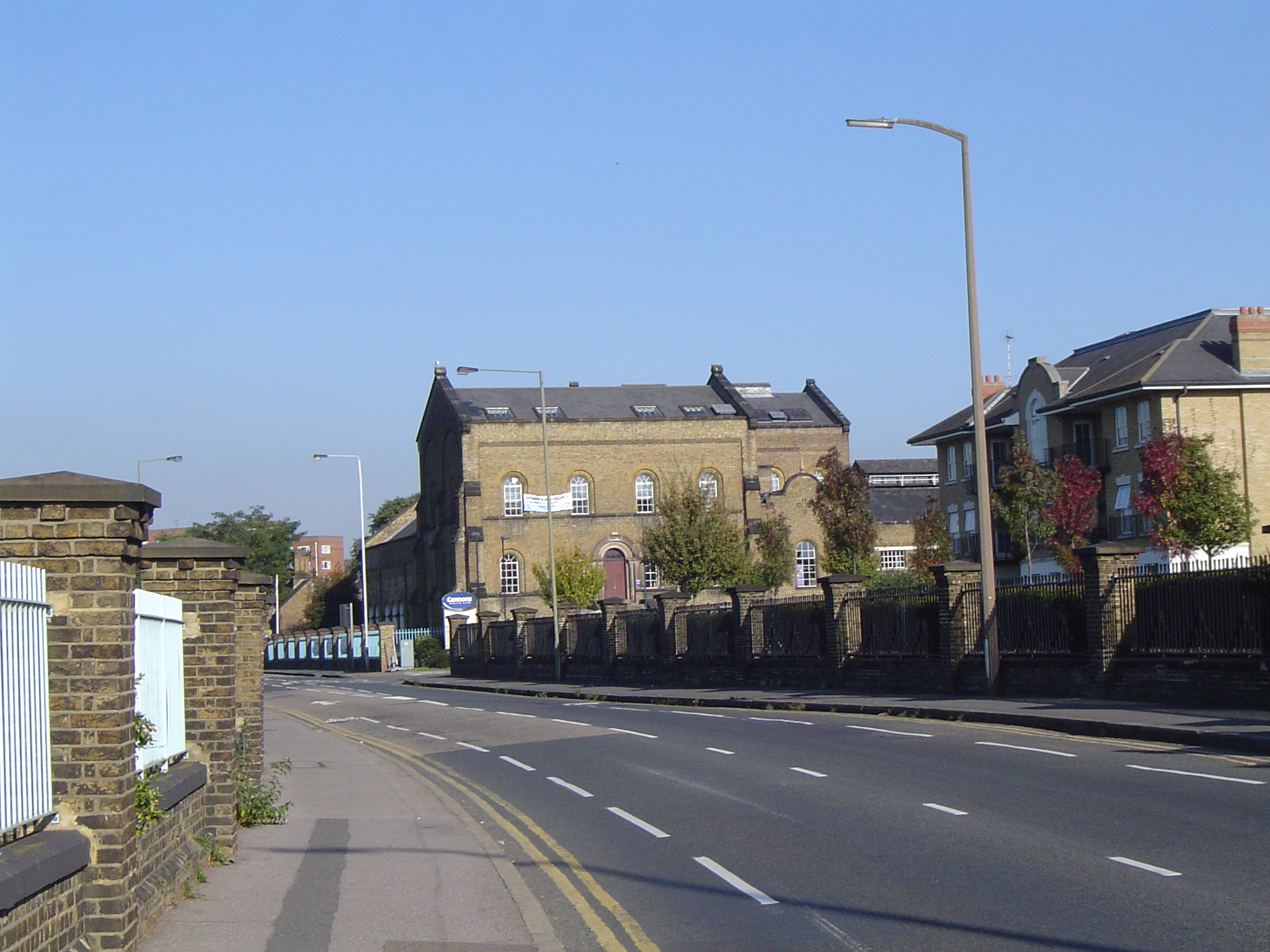
Seething Wells

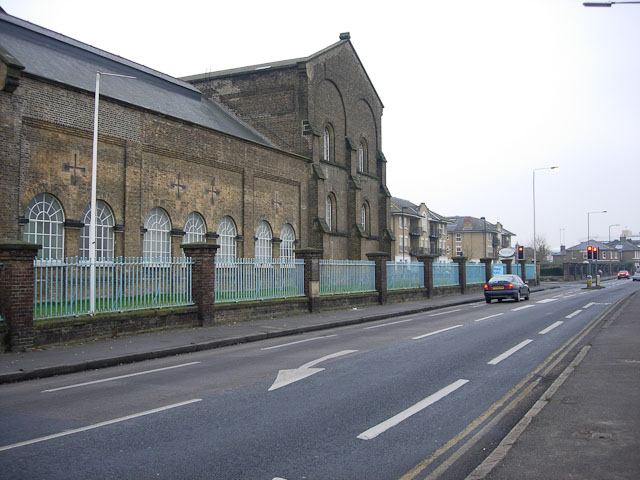
Seething Wells

== Athletics ==
Kingston University London athletic teams are nicknamed the "Cougars".

== International partners ==
The university holds a number of links with institutions from around the world to share teaching and research and facilitate staff and student exchanges. Kingston has a number of international 'Study Abroad' or 'Exchange' partner institutions.

== Controversies ==
=== Humanities department closure 2025 ===
Kingston University has initiated the closure of its humanities department, including its graduate research teaching programme in philosophy, the Centre for Research in Modern European Philosophy (CRMEP). In February 2024, the Head of the School of Creative and Cultural Industries advised students that it had launched a review of its philosophy programme, citing declining enrolment, lack of government funding and the Philosophy programme’s focus on post-graduate teaching as reasons. The review was expected to complete in six weeks. The outcome of that review was not made public. On 26 February 2025, the Dean of Kingston School of Art advised students that Kingston had begun a 30 day consultation period to shut down teaching in the entirety of the humanities, to include closure of its English and philosophy programmes, stating that these programmes are inconsistent with Kingston’s new Town House strategy and future skills delivery.

The Times Higher Education noted that "Kingston has also suspended applications for new students to its foundation year humanities programme “with a view to it closing in the new longer term”, according to the email sent by Kingston School of Art dean Mandy Ure." The closures are also expected to affect the creative writing program and the Kingston Language Scheme which teaches modern languages. In an open letter, published in the contemporary art forum e-Flux and the British publishing house Verso, the CRMEP students state they "unequivocally condemn" the closures, writing that the proposals are an "affront against a broadly humanist concept of education, in which the independence of culture and research from immediate market imperatives" affirms their social value. Kingston University's Senior Leadership Team led by the Vice-Chancellor Stephen Spier has expressed its intention to implement £20 million in savings and to lay-off staff and close programmes to take effect at the end of July. The Kingston University College Union has since passed a motion of 'no-confidence' in the Senior Leadership Team.

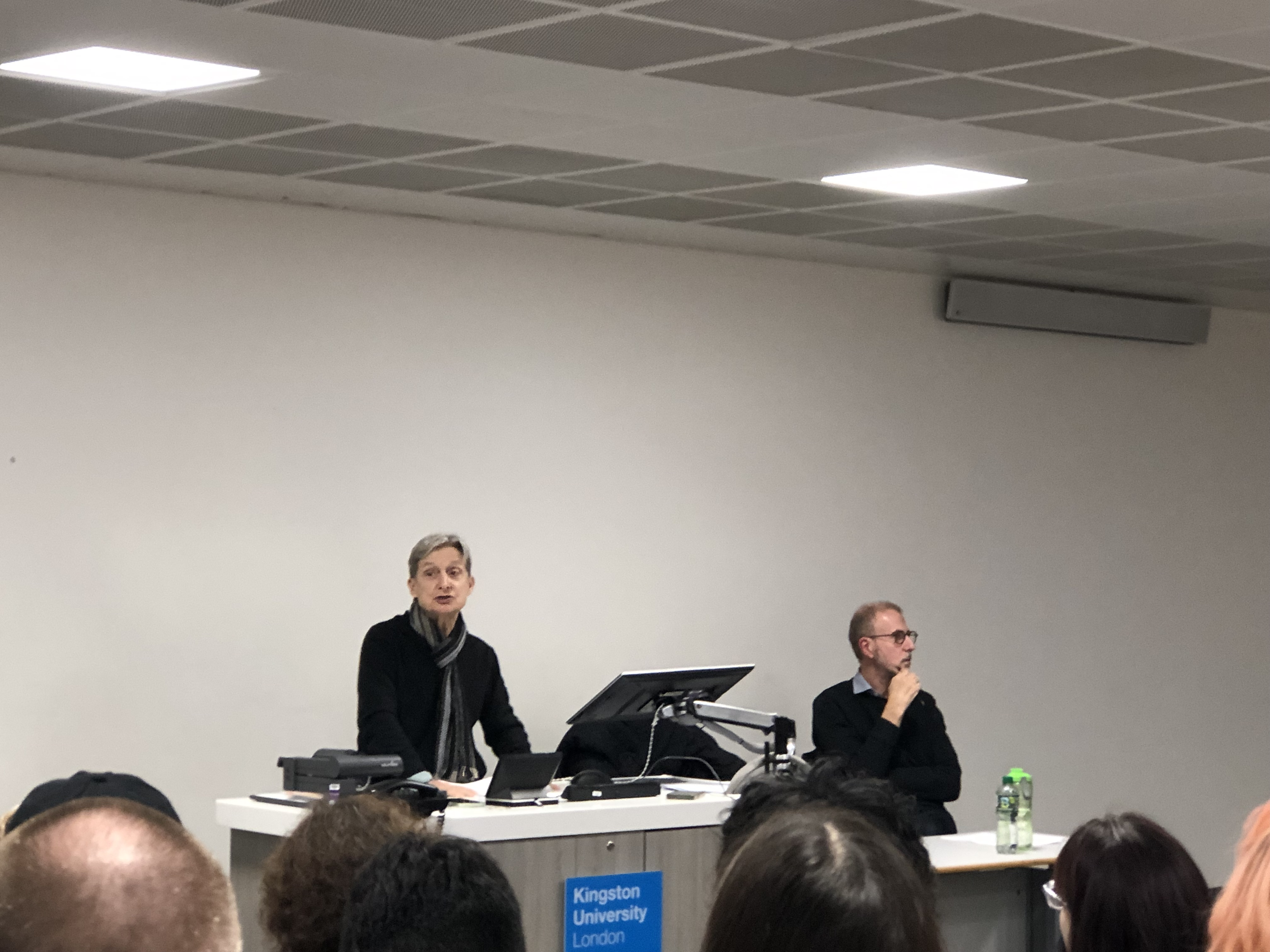
Judith Butler speaking on Kafka at CRMEP Feb 2024

=== BMus external examiner ===
In 2008, the BBC obtained e-mails circulated within Kingston's School of Music, relating to the opinions of an external examiner moderating the BMus course. The messages showed that her final report caused considerable concern within the department. The examiner was persuaded to moderate her criticism following contact from a member of the university's staff. The e-mails also detailed a plan to replace her (at the end of her term) with a more experienced and broad-based external examiner, a process which Kingston stressed breaks no rules relating to the appointment of such examiners.

In October 2008, Peter Williams, Chief Executive of the UK Quality Assurance Agency (QAA), presented the agency's findings to a Parliamentary Select Committee charged with investigating standards in British higher education. Following an investigation of the allegations by a former University staff member that undue pressure was applied to the School of Music's External Examiner, QAA upheld all charges of wrongdoing, as alleged.

=== Controversial speakers ===
In 2015, Prime Minister David Cameron named and shamed four British universities which gave platforms to allegedly 'extremist' speakers.

Kingston's Vice Chancellor Julius Weinberg defended his decision to allow controversial speakers in the name of free speech.

=== National Student Survey exaggeration ===
In 2008, an audio recording obtained by student media included two psychology lecturers asking students to inflate their graded opinions given as part of the National Student Survey. One member of staff was recorded as encouraging students to boost specific satisfaction scores, because "if Kingston comes down the bottom [of the league tables], then the bottom line is that nobody is going to want to employ you because they are going to think your degree is shit". In response, Vice-Chancellor Peter Scott confirmed that the recording was genuine but added that he believed that the incident was an isolated one. In July 2008, the Higher Education Funding Council of England removed the university's Department of Psychology of the Faculty of Arts and Social Sciences from the League Tables for the year as its sanction for having fraudulently manipulated the National Student Survey results.

== Notable alumni ==
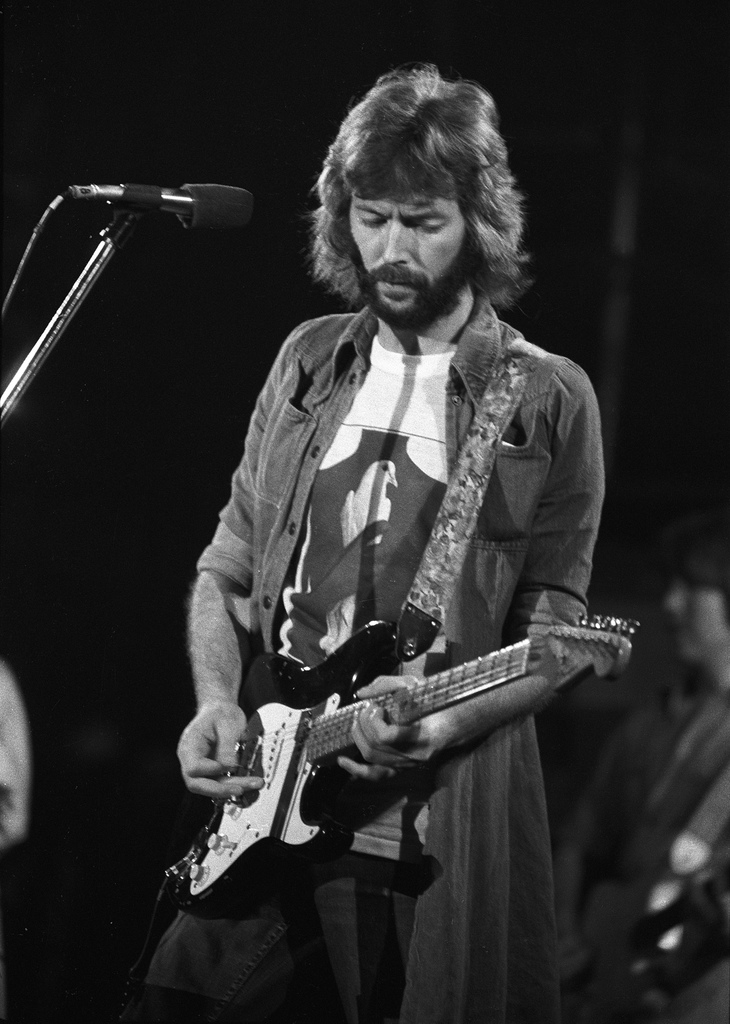
Eric Clapton is the only three-time inductee into the Rock and Roll Hall of Fame.

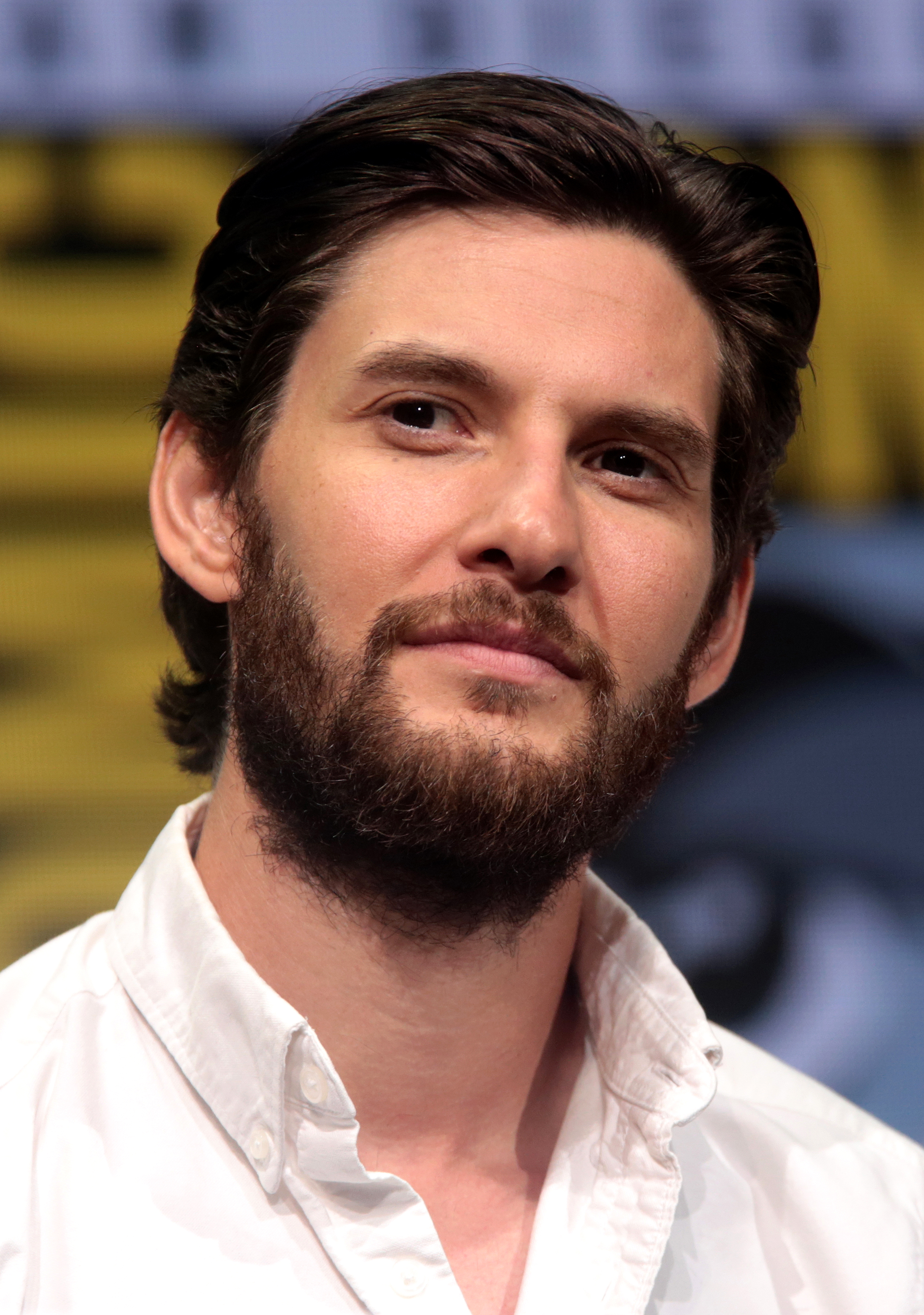
Ben Barnes at 2017 San Diego Comic- Con.

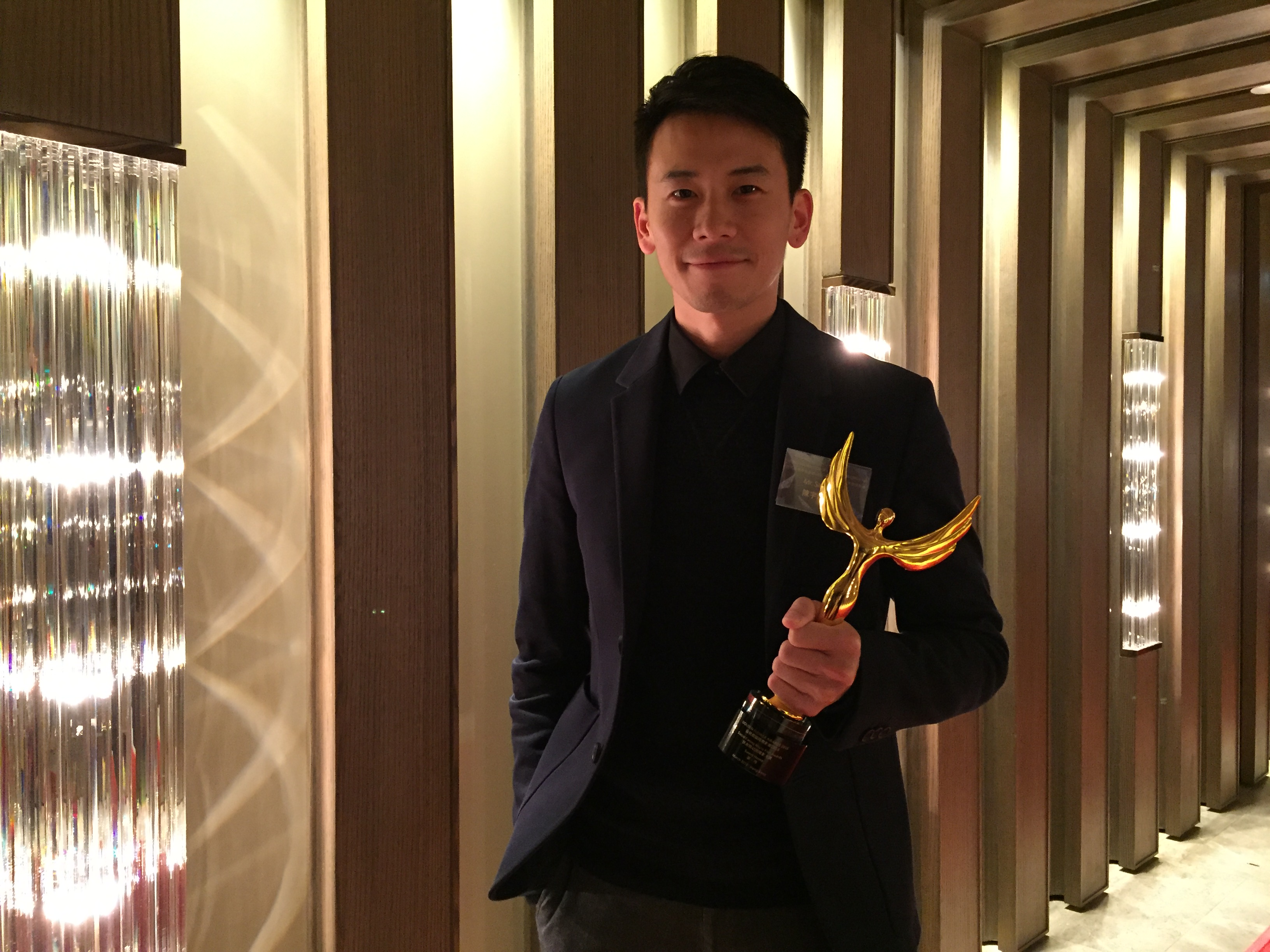
Sam Chan at the 2016 Golden Flower Awards.

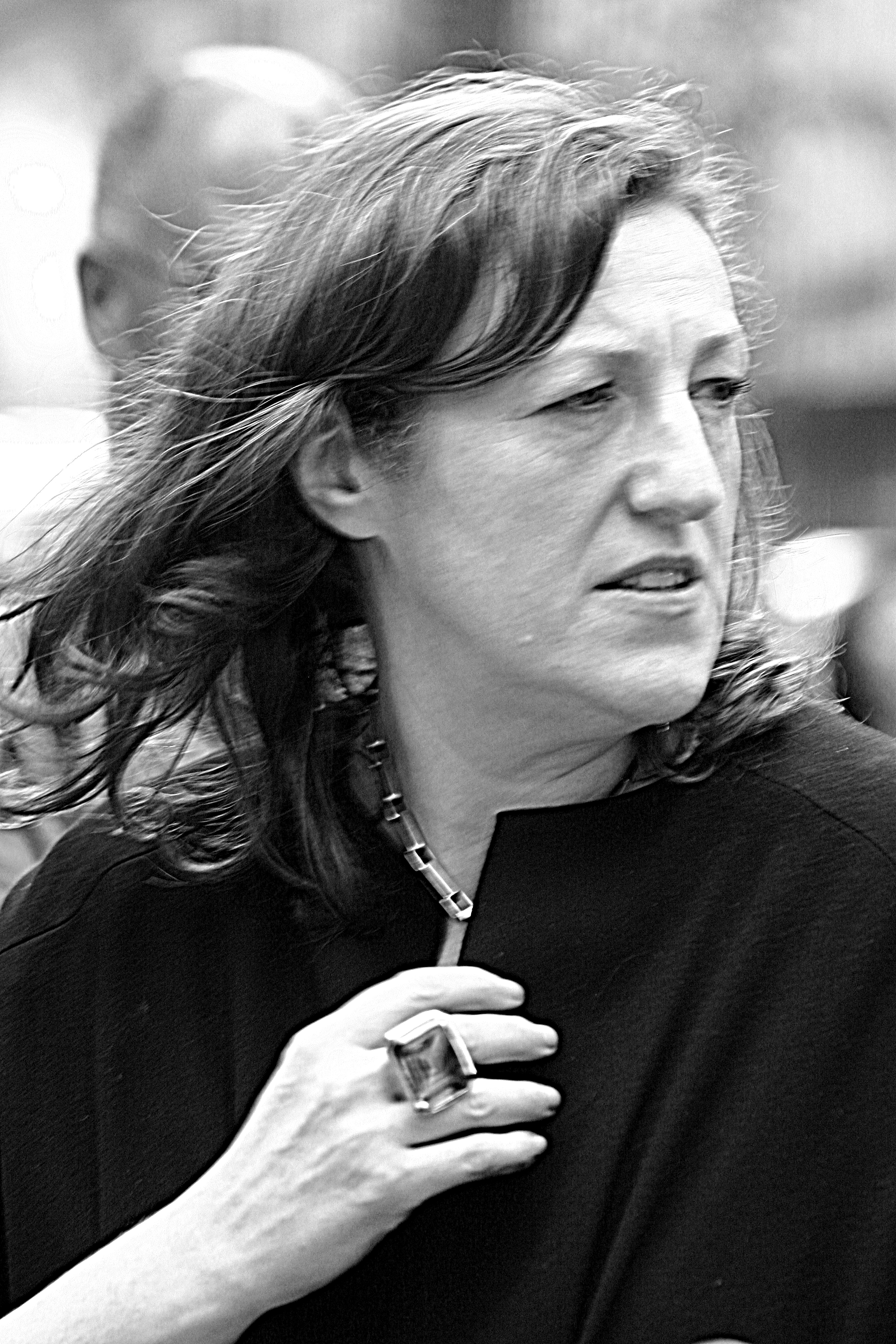
Glenda Bailey

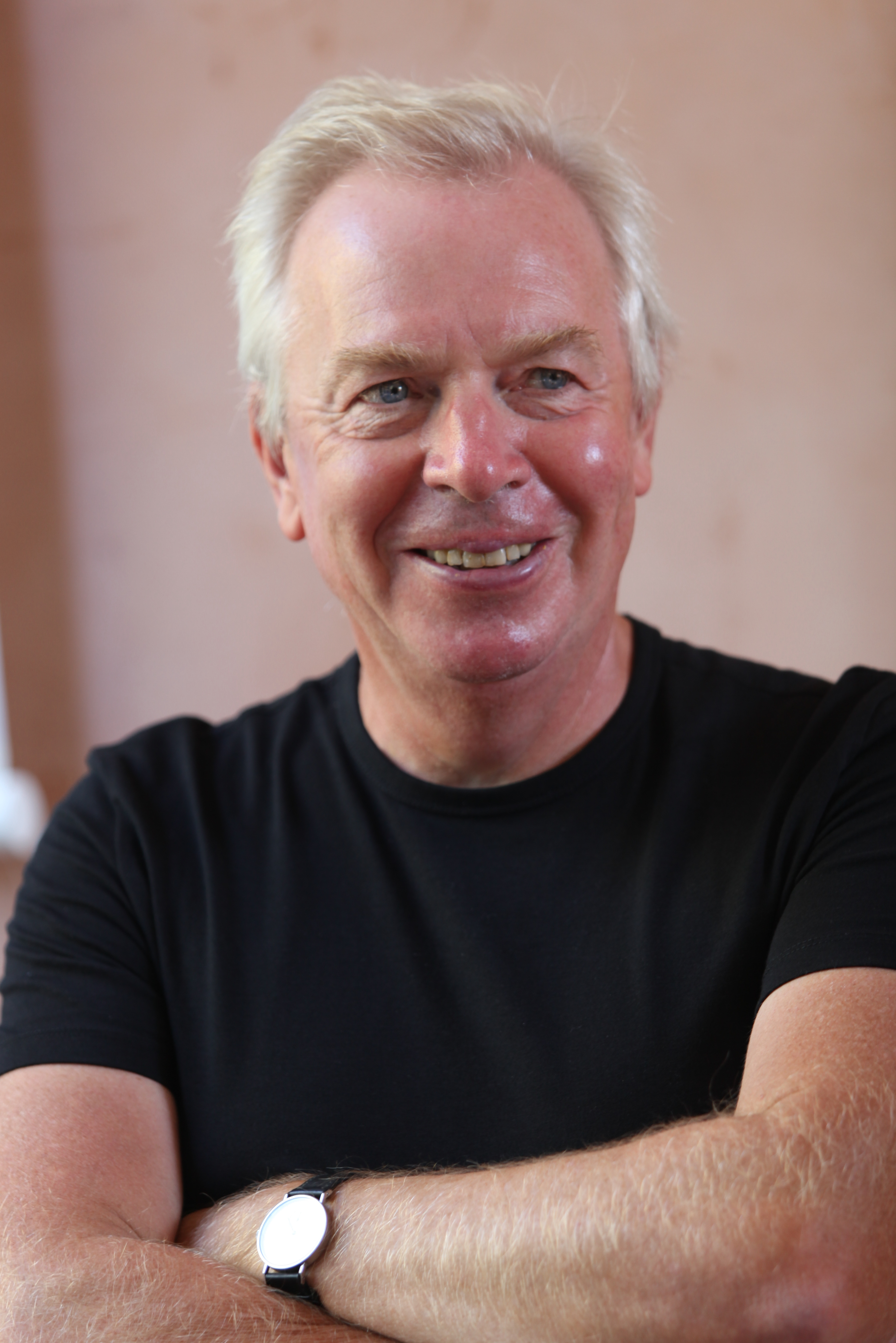
Sir David Alan Chipperfield

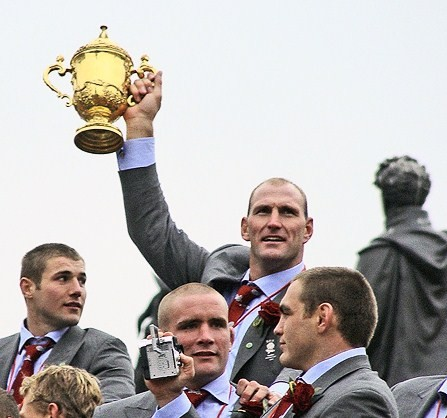
Lawrence Dallaglio holding the Rugby World Cup.

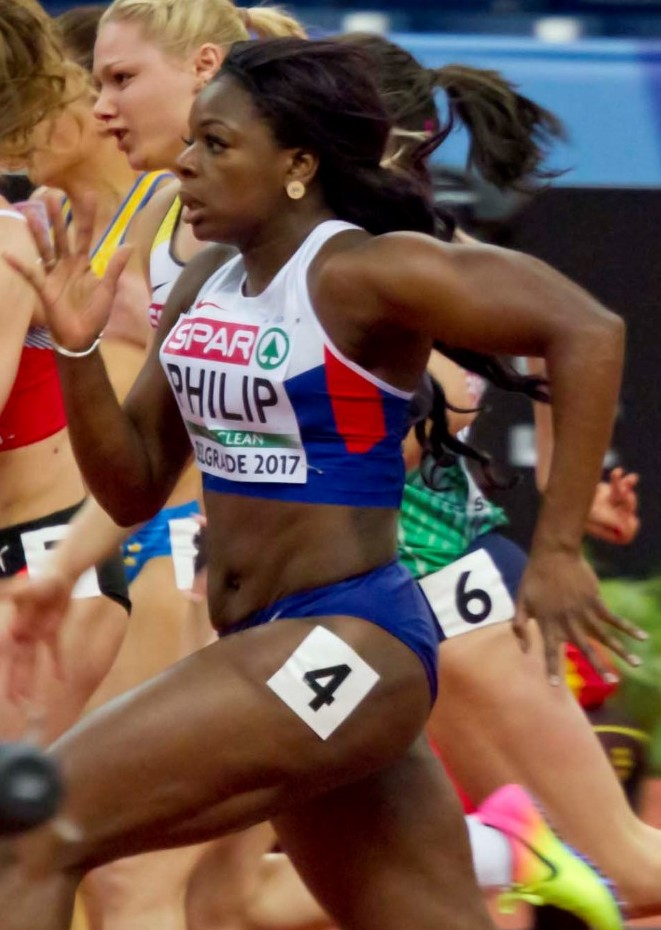
Asha Philip in 2017.

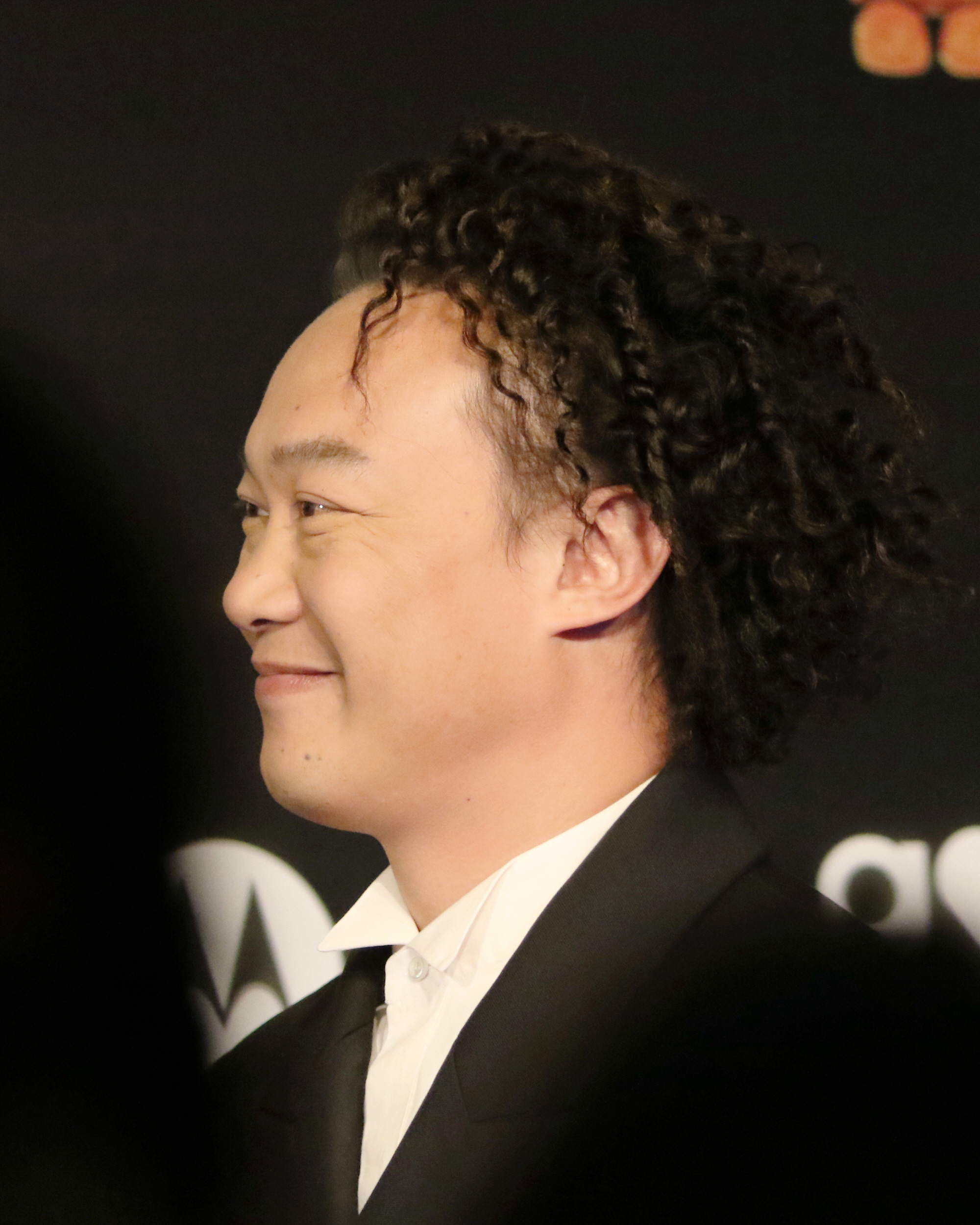
Eason Chan in 2016.

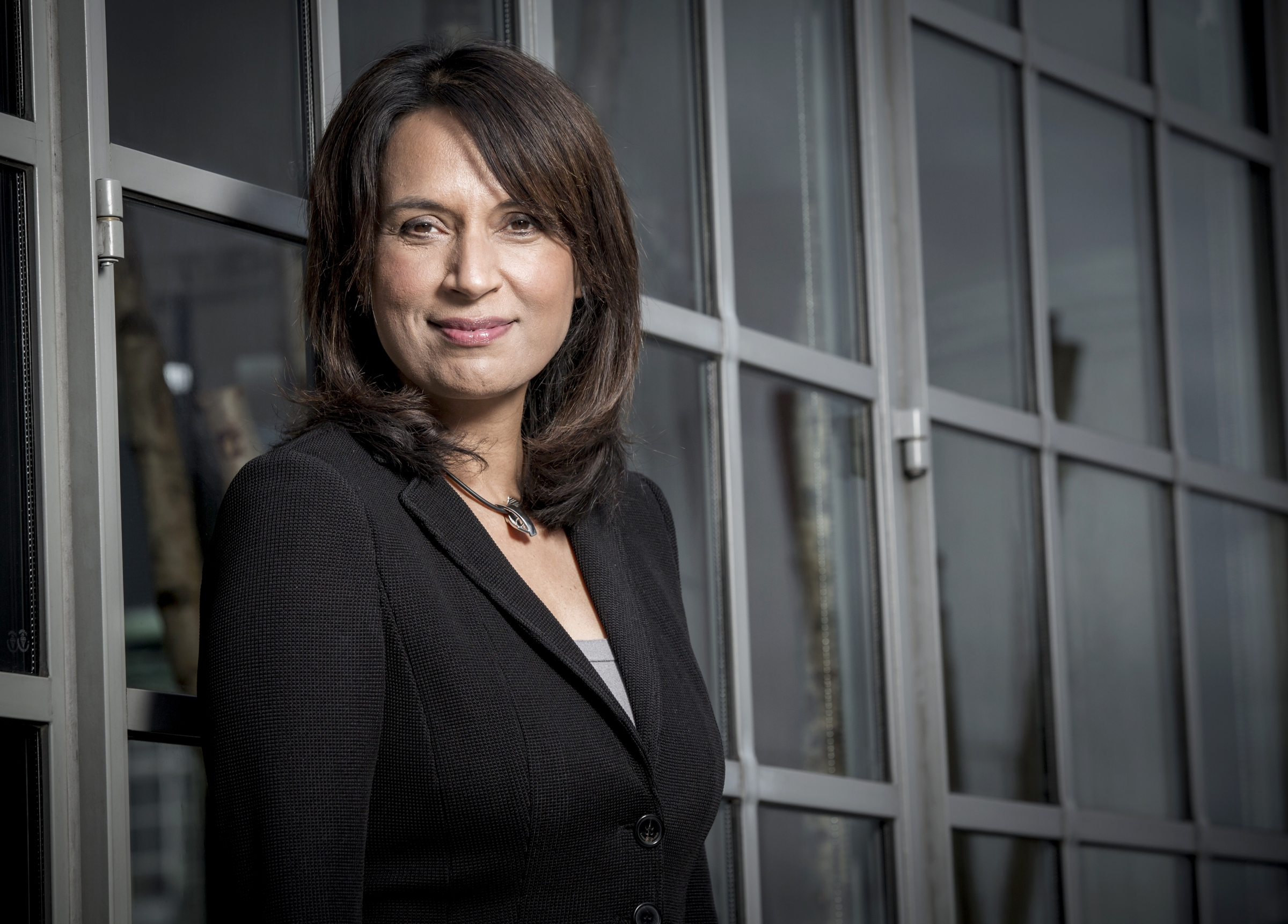
Ruby McGregor-Smith in 2013.

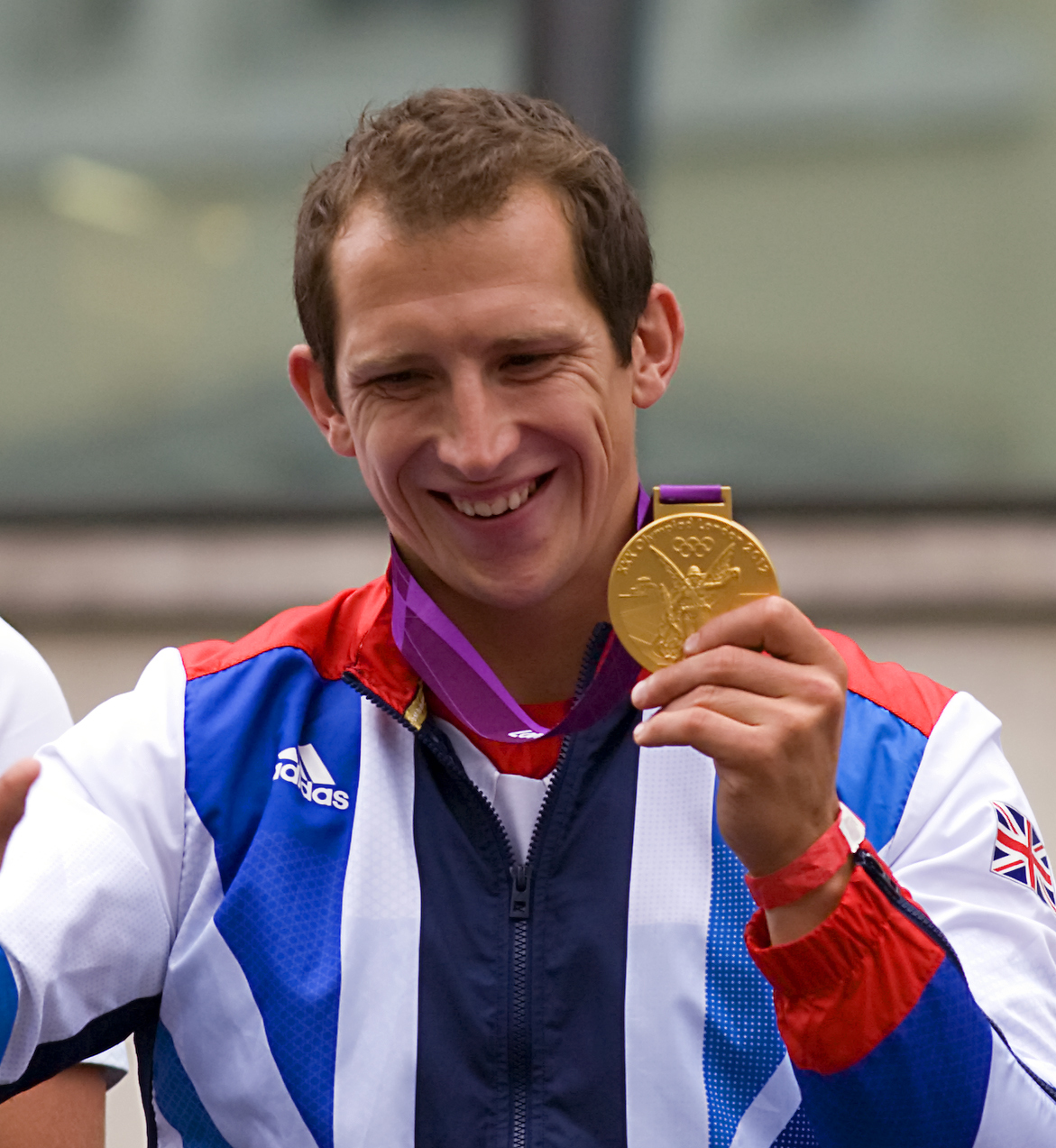
Ed McKeever - London 2012 Olympic Games Victory.

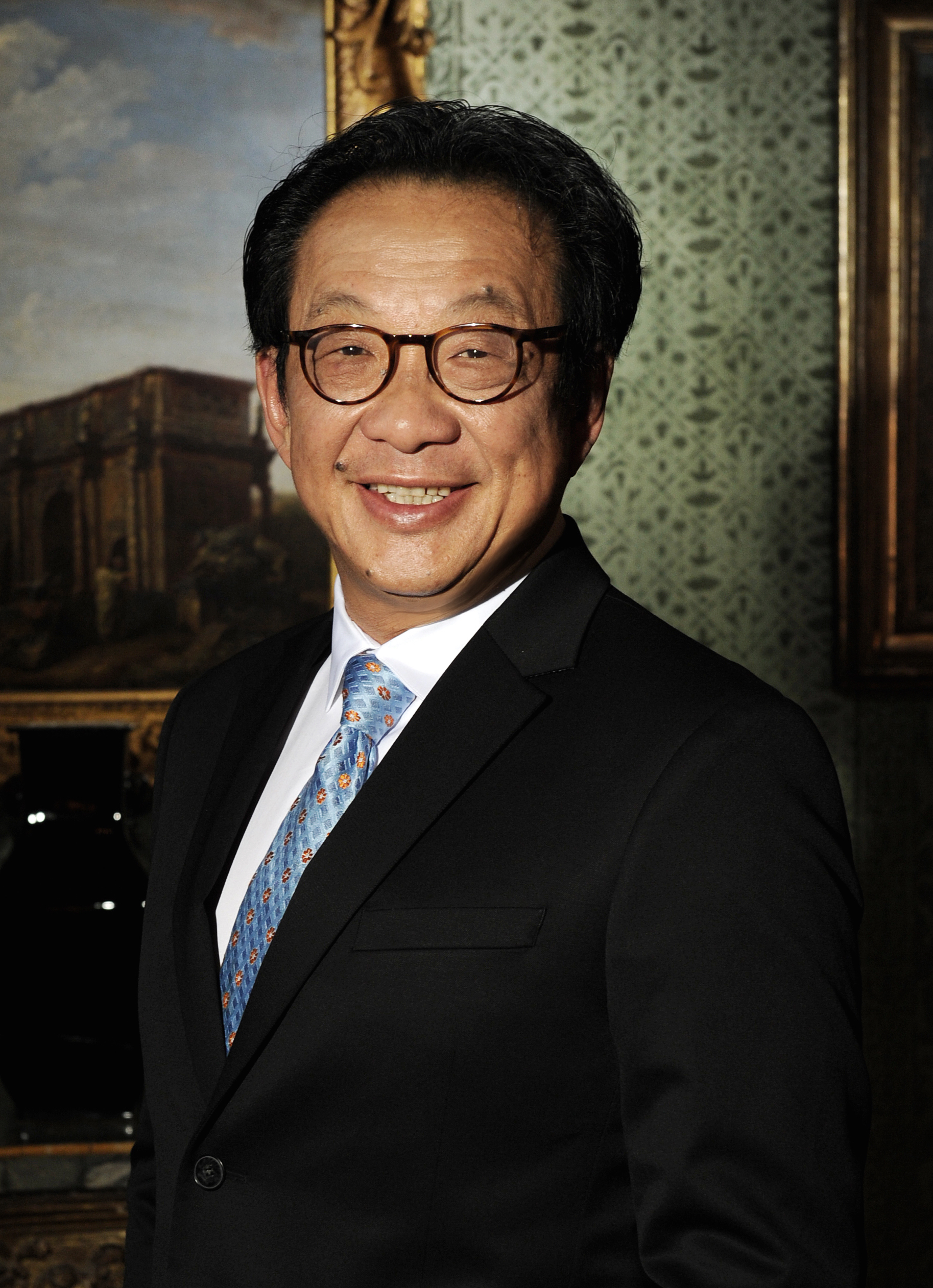
Francis Yeoh in 2015.

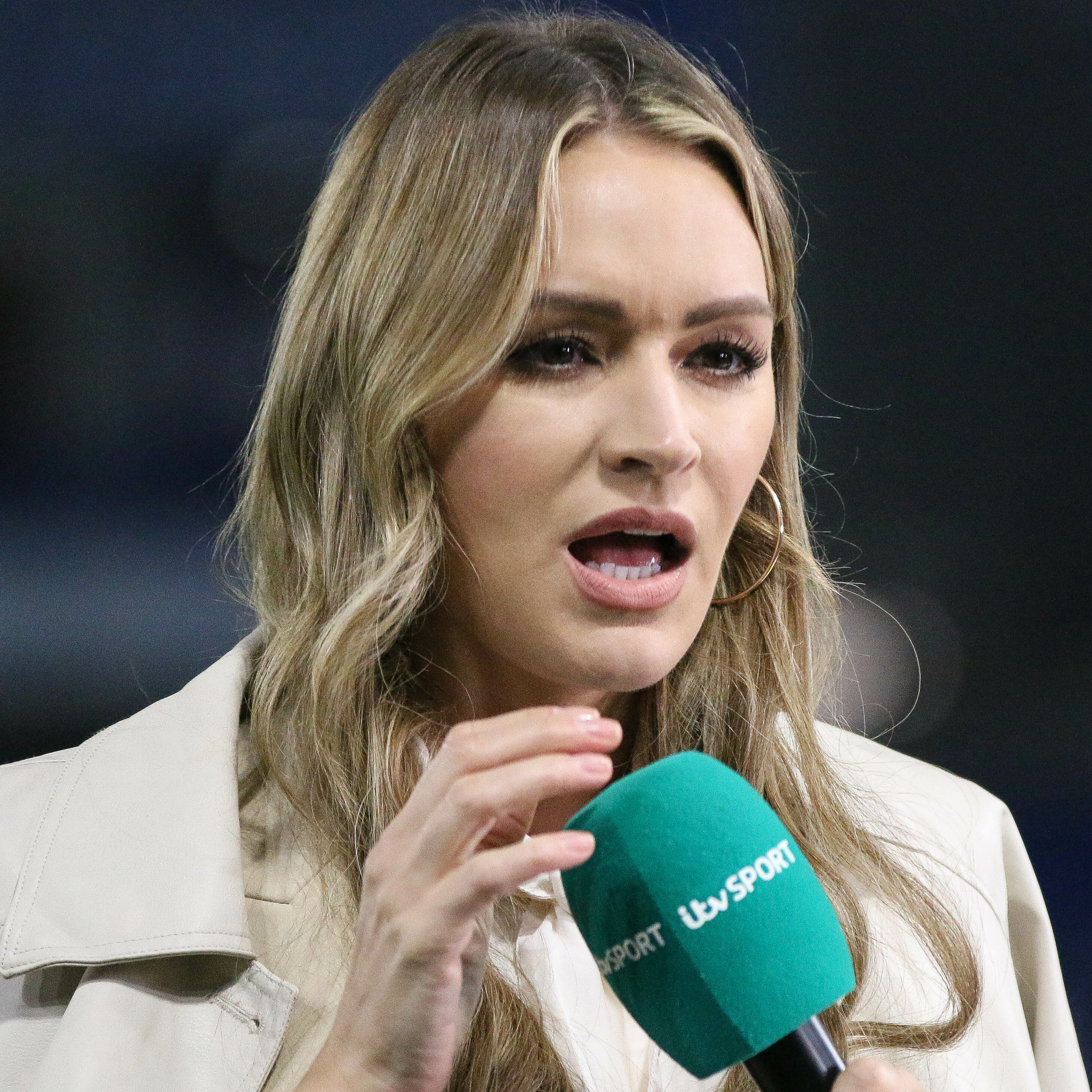
Laura Woods presenting for ITV in 2022.

=== Film and entertainment ===
- Ben Barnes, actor and singer
- Angie Bowie, American actress, former wife of David Bowie and mother of Duncan Jones
- Jessie Cave, actress known for her role as Lavender Brown in the Harry Potter film series
- Sam Chan, Hong Kong actor
- Trevor Cooper, actor
- Sarah-Jane Crawford, TV presenter, radio presenter and former model
- Alphonsia Emmanuel, actor
- Trevor Eve, actor
- Laura Harling, actor
- June Kirby, actress and designer
- Jamal Osman, Africa correspondent for Channel 4 News
- Mandy Takhar, British actress and singer in Indian film

=== Humour ===
- Harriet Kemsley, standup comedian and actress
- Chris McCausland, stand-up comedian and actor

=== Arts ===
- Noor Al Suwaidi, Emirati artist and curator
- Eileen Aldridge, artist and illustrator
- Fiona Banner, artist, Turner Prize nominee
- Scott Barley, filmmaker and artist
- Zelma Blakely, artist
- John Bratby, artist
- Gail Brodholt, oil paintings and linocut prints
- Richard Bryant, photographer
- Pery Burge, artist
- Raphael Chikukwa, curator and Executive Director of the National Gallery of Zimbabwe
- Victoria Crowe, painter
- Adelaide Damoah, artist
- Lilian Dring, artist
- Anya Gallaccio, artist
- Karen Hall, illustrator
- Jim Holdaway, illustrator
- James Irvine, product designer
- Jasper Morrison, product designer
- David Nash, sculptor
- Laura Noble, art writer and photography gallerist
- Bianca Raffaella, artist
- Yoshiko Shimada (嶋田 美子), Japanese video artist and performance artist
- Fletcher Sibthorp, artist
- Michael Young, industrial designer

=== Fashion ===
- Glenda Bailey, former editor-in-chief of Marie-Claire and Harper's Bazaar
- Felipe Oliveira Baptista, artistic director of such brands as Lacoste or Kenzo
- Caryn Franklin, fashion journalist, broadcaster, writer, director and producer
- Richard Nott, one half of 1989 Designer of the Year winner Workers for Freedom
- John Richmond, fashion designer

=== Architecture ===
- David Chipperfield, architect
- Sadie Morgan, co-founder of dRMM Architects
- Tom Wright, the architect best known as the designer of the Burj Al Arab in Dubai

=== Music ===
- Richard Archer, lead singer of Hard-Fi
- Eric Clapton, musician (did not graduate).
- Eason Chan, singer (did not graduate)
- Sandy Denny (did not graduate)
- Aleksandra Gintrowska, Polish singer and actress
- Just Jack, musician
- Keith Relf, lead singer of The Yardbirds
- John Renbourn, guitarist
- Robin Rimbaud, electronic musician under the name Scanner

=== Politics ===
- Adel Al Toraifi, Minister of Information and Culture of Saudi Arabia
- Nigel Dakin, Governor of the Turks and Caicos Islands and career diplomat and soldier
- Princess Fadzilah Lubabul Bolkiah, Bruneian princess
- Guy de Faye, former news presenter and former Deputy of the States of Jersey
- Lee Freeman Chief constable of Humberside Police
- Kirsty Hayes, British Ambassador to Portugal
- John Le Fondré, Chief Minister, States of Jersey
- Salahuddin Rabbani, former Minister of Foreign Affairs of Afghanistan
- Hadia Tajik, Pakistani-Norwegian jurist, journalist and politician; appointed Minister of Culture, a Member of Parliament for the Labour Party representing Oslo
- Qubad Talabani, Deputy Prime Minister of the Kurdistan Region and son of Iraqi former President Jalal Talabani
- Riad Yassin, former Foreign Minister of Yemen

=== Law ===
- James Lewis, Chief Justice of the Falkland Islands and the British Indian Ocean Territory
- Imran Mahmood, barrister and novelist
- Leslie Thomas QC, barrister

=== Literature ===
- Lavinia Greenlaw, poet and novelist
- Stewart Home, avant-garde writer, art historian and agent provocateur ( Home left the college before graduating )

=== Religion ===
- Gregory Venables, Bishop of Argentina

=== Sports ===
- Charlie Amesbury, rugby player
- Lawrence Dallaglio, rugby union player, and former captain of the English national team
- Gail Emms, badminton player, Commonwealth Gold and Olympic Silver medallist
- Graeme Le Saux, footballer
- Ed McKeever, Kayak World Champion and Olympic Gold Medallist
- Asha Philip, English sprinter, Olympic bronze medal at the 2016 Rio Games and silver at the 2017 World Championships in Athletics

=== Technology and engineering ===
- Ed Parsons, Geospatial technologist and tech evangelist

=== Business and finance ===
- Tony Ball, marketer, former Chief Executive of BSkyB
- Chinwe Egwim, economist, banker
- Sima Kamil, Deputy Governor of State Bank of Pakistan
- Ruby McGregor-Smith, CEO MITIE Group
- Vin Murria, Operating Partner of HgCapital
- Marlene Taschen, co-manages Taschen
- John Tiner, financial adviser, businessman
- Francis Yeoh, businessman, Executive Chairman of YTL Corporation
- Ratheesan Yoganathan, businessman, Chairman of Lebara Group

== Notable faculty and staff ==
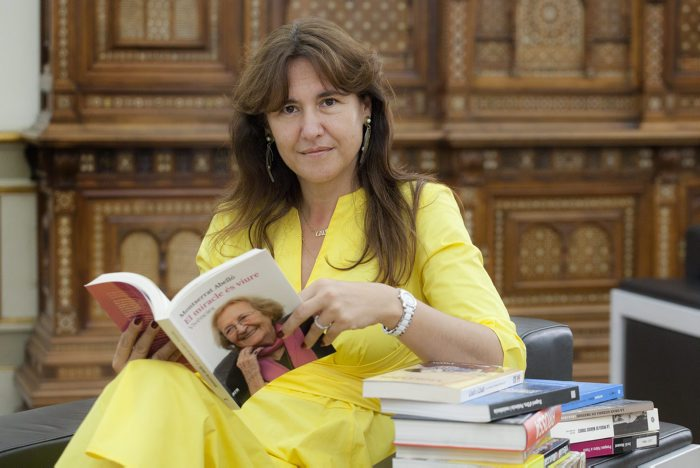
Laura Borràs

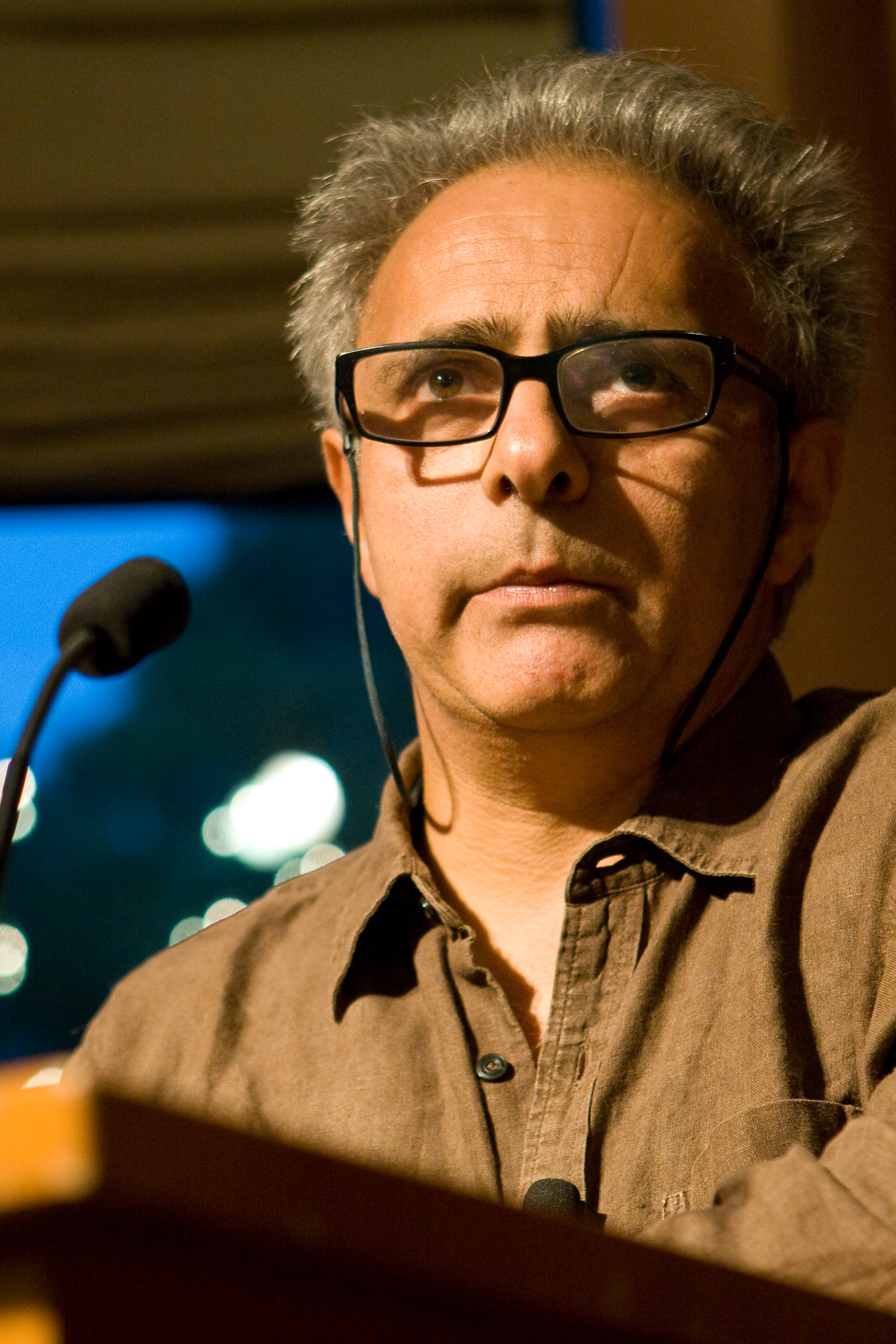
Hanif Kureishi

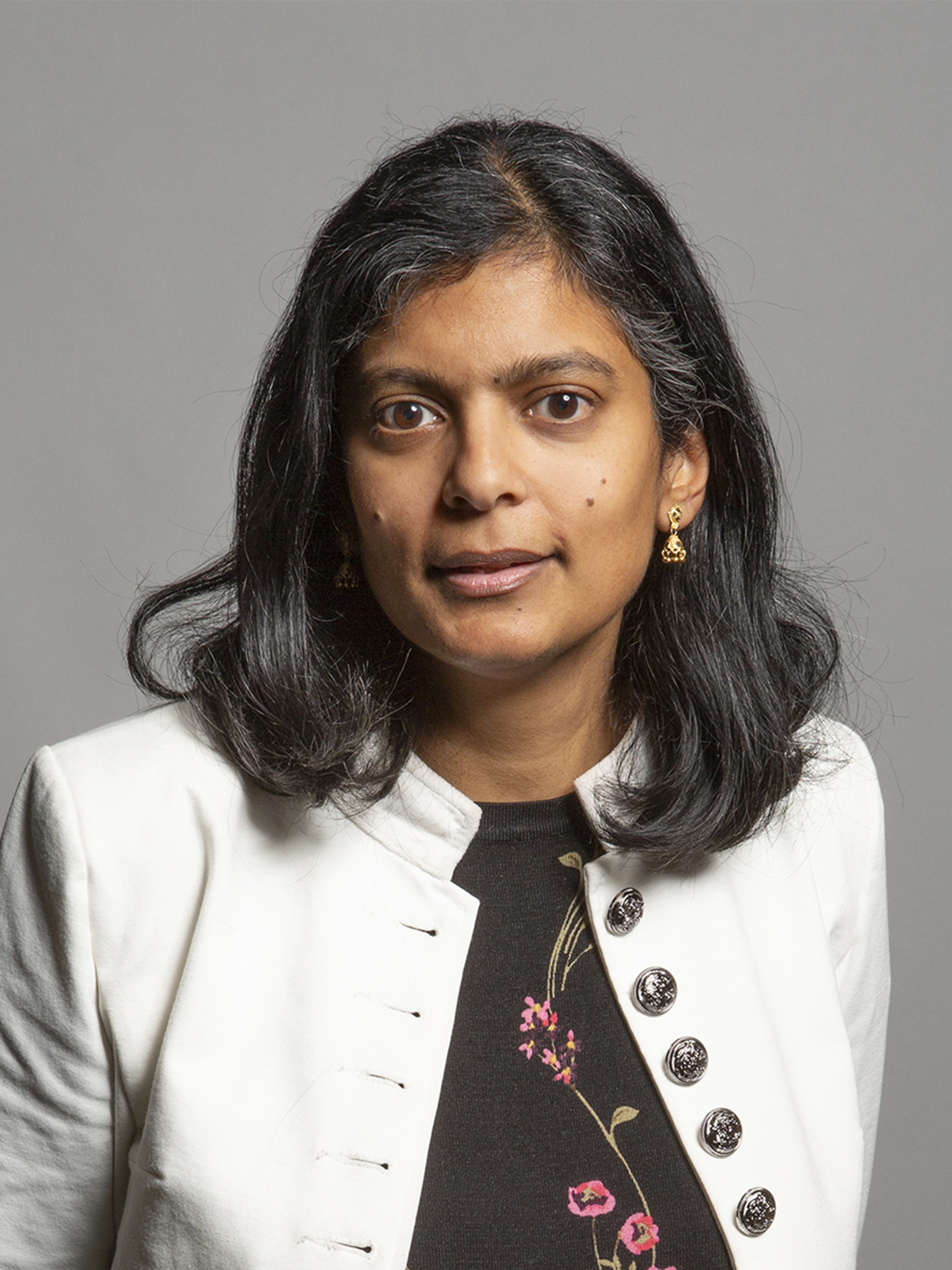
Rupa Huq

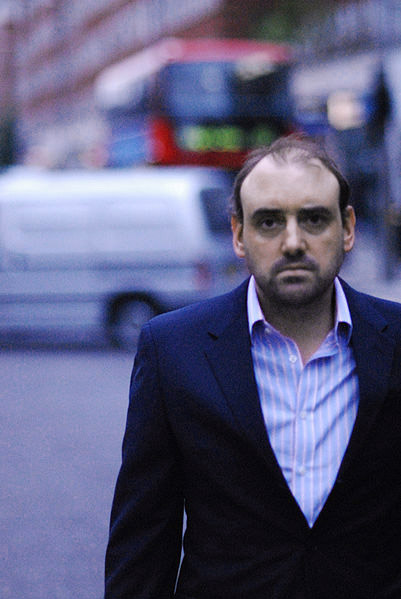
Henry Bond

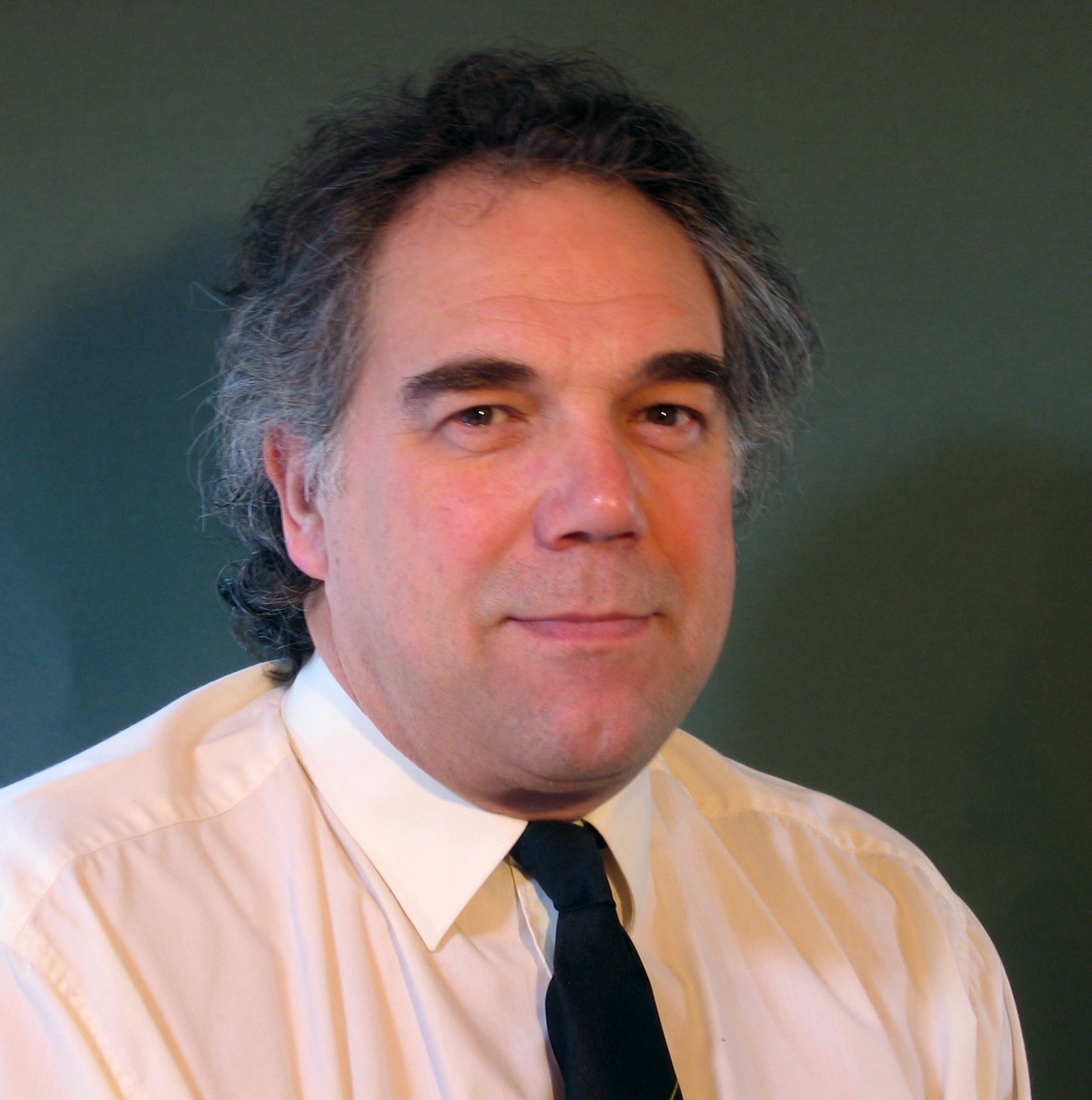
Les Hatton

Alan Gillett at St Mary's Perivale in 2012.

=== Arts ===
- Stephen Barber, professor of art history.
- Henry Bond, Senior lecturer in photography.
- Michael Chaplin, English intaglio printmaker and watercolour painter, lecturer in art (1970s & 80s)
- Wilfred Fairclough, English engraver and printmaker.
- Henry Haig, English painter, sculptor and glassblower.
- Carole Hodgson, professor of fine arts and sculpture.
- Chris Horrocks, professor of art history.
- Jane Manning, research fellow & visiting music professor.

=== Film and theatre ===
- Felicity Colman, Professor of Film and Media Arts
- Alex McSweeney, English, Creative Writing and Drama.
- Catherine O'Brien, emeritus lecturer in Film Studies and French
- Paul Andrew Williams, Film studies lecturer

=== Philosophy and literature ===
- Eric Alliez, Professor of Contemporary French Philosophy
- Etienne Balibar, Visiting Professor
- Paul Bailey, Senior Researcher and Distinguished Writer in Residence, Creative Writing
- Howard Caygill, Professor of Philosophy
- Peter J. Conradi, Professor Emeritus
- Rachel Cusk, Reader in Creative Writing
- Vic Duppa-Whyte, Paper engineer, pop-up book creator
- Vesna Goldsworthy, Professor of English Literature and Creative Writing
- Philippa Gregory, Fellow
- Peter Hallward, Professor of Modern European Philosophy
- Hanif Kureishi, Distinguished Writer in Residence, Creative Writing
- Catherine Malabou, Professor of Modern European Philosophy
- Laura Noble, English writer, gallerist and artist
- Peter Osborne, Professor of Philosophy, Director of the Centre for Research in Modern European Philosophy
- Stella Sandford, Professor of Modern European Philosophy

=== Fashion and design ===
- Moya Bowler, former fashion lecturer – shoe designer of the 1960s–1980s
- Catherine McDermott, Professor of Design
- Richard Nott, former fashion lecturer and former student

=== History and politics ===
- Brian Brivati, Visiting Professor
- Steve Keen Professor and Head of the School of Economics, History and Politics

=== Health ===
- Robert Istepanian, Professor of Data Communications
- Fiona Ross, Professor of Health Research, formerly Executive Dean of the Faculty of Health and Social Care.

=== Economy ===
- Rima Horton, senior economics lecturer.

== See also ==
- Armorial of UK universities
- List of universities in the United Kingdom
- Post-1992 universities
