= Yoganathan =

Yoganathan (Tamil: யோகநாதன்) is a Tamil patronymic surname and masculine given name. Notable people with the surname include:

- M. Yoganathan (born 1969), Indian environmental activist
- Ratheesan Yoganathan (born 1975), British entrepreneur
- Vimal Yoganathan (born 2006), Welsh footballer
