= Catherine McDermott =

Catherine McDermott is a Professor of Design at Kingston University in London, England. She specialises in the curation of contemporary design, and has been described by Design Week as "one of design's most prominent academics".

McDermott received a National Teaching Fellowship in 2015, and was a 2016 recipient of the Sir Misha Black Award for Innovation in Design Education, for her work setting up a master's program at Kingston in contemporary design curation.

== Books ==
McDermott's books include:

- Street Style: British Design in the 80s (London: Design Council, 1987)
- Essential Design (Bloomsbury, 1993)
- 20th C Design (Carlton, 1997)
- The Design Museum Book of 20th Century Design (Overlook Press / Peter Mayer Publishers, 1998)
- Alessi (with Michael Collins, Alessi, 1999)
- Vivienne Westwood (Carlton, 1999)
- Matthew Hilton: Furniture for Our Time (Lund Humphries, 2000)
- The Little Book of Design Classics (Carlton, 2002)
- Design: The Key Concepts (Routledge, 2007)
- Contemporary Design: 1900-Today (Carlton, 2008)
- European Design Since 1985: Shaping the New Century (with R. Craig Miller and Penny Sparke, Merrell, 2009)
