= Sima Kamil =

Pakistani banker

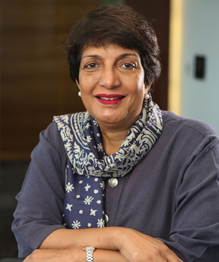
- Born: Karachi, Pakistan
- Education: Karachi Grammar School
- Alma mater: Kingston University; City, University of London
- Occupation: Banker
- Years active: 1986–present
- Employer: State Bank of Pakistan
- Known for: First woman to lead a major Pakistani bank
- Title: Deputy Governor of the State Bank of Pakistan

Sima Kamil is a Pakistani banker who has served as the deputy governor of State Bank of Pakistan since August 2020. Previously, she served as the president and chief executive officer of United Bank Limited from June 2017 to June 2020, the first woman to lead a major Pakistani bank.

== Early life and education ==
Kamil grew up in Karachi; her father was also from Karachi, and her mother's family moved from East Punjab to Lahore during the Partition of India. Her parents met at a poetry reading in Lahore.

Kamil attended Karachi Grammar School, where she developed an interest in literature and history, before moving to the United Kingdom to attend university, graduating with a degree in business from Kingston University in 1983, and a Master of Business Administration (MBA) from City, University of London. She was offered a place to study development economics at Oxford University, but as her family could not afford to pay, she returned to Karachi to work.

== Career ==
=== Early career ===
Her first career role was working as a corporate relationship manager for American Express in Karachi (1986-88), before she moved to a position at ANZ Grindlays Bank, first in Karachi and then Lahore. During 11 years at ANZ Grindlays, Kamil gradually rose up through the company ranks, spending two years working in Melbourne in the mid-1990s, before returning to Pakistan to become the head of credit for the bank, and subsequently corporate regional executive.

When ANZ sold its regional Grindlays operations to Standard Chartered Bank in 2000, Kamil moved to the new parent company to a role as a senior credit officer.

=== Habib Bank Limited (2001–2017) ===
In April 2001, Kamil joined Habib Bank Limited (HBL) to run a regional corporate banking unit, being promoted to head the corporate and investment banking division in 2004. She also headed the bank's wealth management division, HBL Asset Management Company Ltd. Under the mentorship of Rafiuddin Zakir Mahmood, chief executive of HBL, Kamil was prepared for management of other areas of the business, and in January 2011, Kamil was appointed as head of HBL's branch banking network, managing thousands of employees and overseeing a large expansion of their bank's branch network. While Kamil was managing the branch banking division, the bank recorded the highest annual average current account deposit growth in the industry, placing it first among Pakistan's banks. In 2016 she also developed and launched HBL Nisa, the bank's Women's Market Program, an attempt to promote HBL services to women, for which the bank was awarded the title of GBA Women's Champion by the Global Banking Alliance for Women.

In March 2017, Kamil was included in Pakistan Today's list of "Pakistan's Only Powerful Women in Business", one of 18 women on the list.

=== United Bank Limited (2017–2020) ===
In March 2017, Kamil was appointed Deputy CEO of United Bank Limited (UBL), and it was announced that she would be taking over as president and CEO of the bank on 1 June 2017, replacing Wajahat Hussain. She was the first woman to lead a major Pakistani bank. In 2018, she was recognised as an "Influential Leader" by the Association to Advance Collegiate Schools of Business (AACSB), for her impact on diversity and inclusion.

=== State Bank of Pakistan (2020–2023) ===
On 25 August 2020, Kamil was appointed deputy governor of the State Bank of Pakistan, for a period of three years. She is the first woman to hold this position.

== Board memberships ==
Kamil has been a board member of UBL since February 2019. She was also the director of First MicroFinance Bank, a microfinance provider.

Kamil is the chair of the board of governors of Karachi Grammar School, and is a board member of the Notre Dame Institute of Education, and the governing body of Holy Family Hospital in Karachi.

== Personal life ==
Kamil's husband is a lawyer in Karachi.
