= Ed Parsons =

Geospatial technologist, tech evangelist (born 1965)

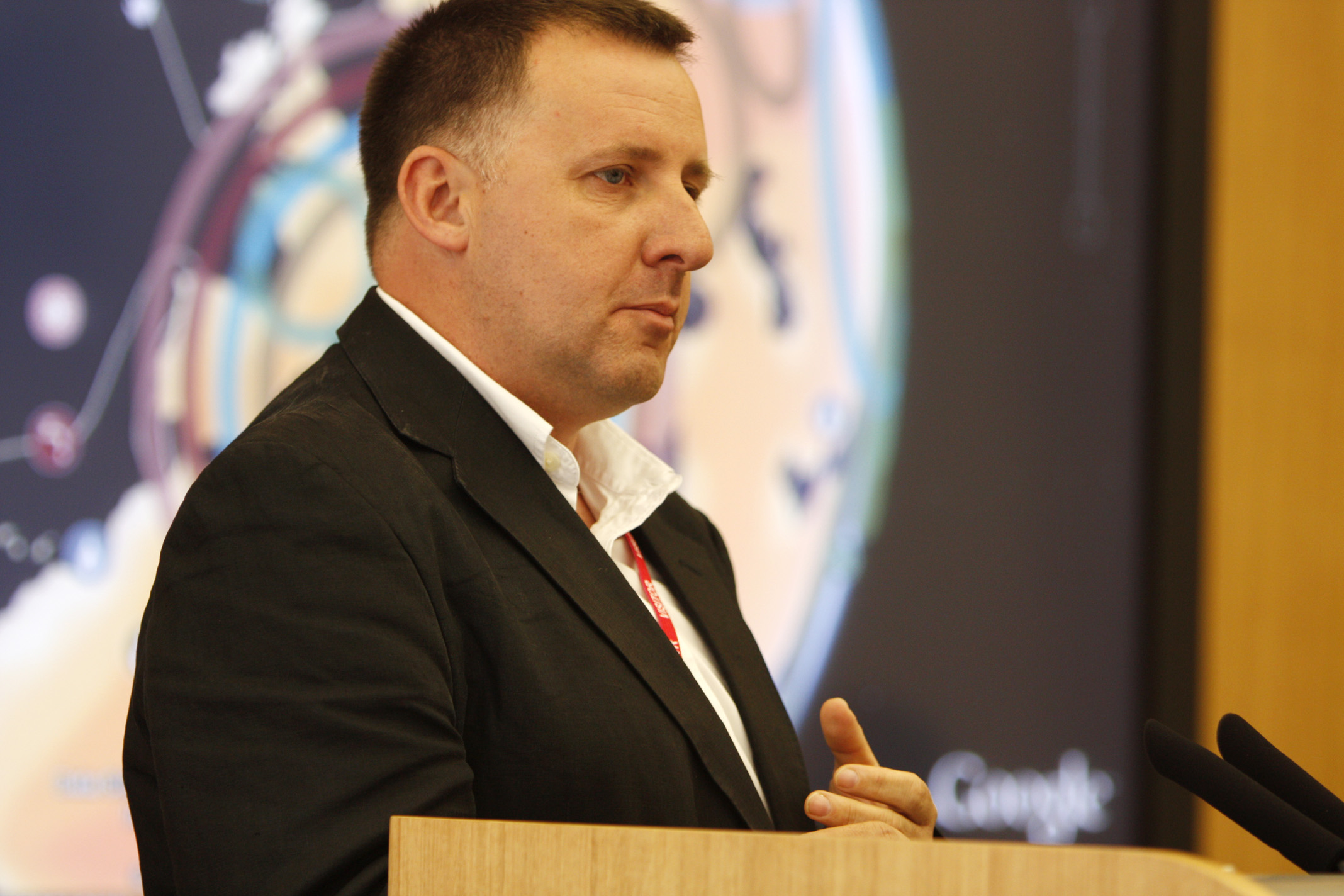
- Born: 26 September 1965 (age 61)
- Citizenship: British
- Education: Kingston University, BSc (hons); Cranfield Institute of Technology, M.S
- Occupation: Geospatial Technologist at Google
- Website: www.edparsons.com

Ed Parsons (born 26 September 1965) is a London-based Geospatial Technologist and tech evangelist at Google. He is working to evangelise geospatial data for commercial application and consequently, to improve the usability and efficiency of location based tools at Google. He is credited as being one of the core proponents of Google Street View.

Parsons is a registered member of the Royal Geographical Society and he has been employed at Google since 2007. He is a supporter of the relatively new concept of Neogeography. In 2015, he was appointed co-chair of the W3C/OGC Spatial Data on the Web Working Group, a collaboration between the Open Geospatial Consortium and World Wide Web Consortium along with Kerry Taylor from the Australian National University.

== Early life and education ==
Parsons is a British citizen who graduated from the Kingston Polytechnic (now Kingston University) in 1987 with a BSc (hons) in Geography. In 1989, he was a part of the team that established the world's first undergraduate course in Geographic information system at Kingston University. He completed his master's degree from the Cranfield Institute of Technology with an M.S. in Applied Remote sensing in 1989.

== Career ==
After completing his M.S., Parsons began teaching GIS at the Kingston University. He continued teaching there until 1998. During his tenure, he is credited with having created the first online map of general election results of 1997.

In 1998, he moved to Autodesk as an EMEA Applications Manager for the Geographical Information Systems Division. He joined Ordnance Survey in 2001 as the organization's first Chief Technology Officer and played an instrumental role in moving the course of the organization from mapping to geographical information and went on to become the youngest director of IT.

When Google Maps was launched in 2005, he described the event as ‘’In a few months Google Maps has done more to allow the individual to develop mapping based websites than the traditional GIS industry has done in 10 years. However, in June 2005, he was one of the first observers of the typing error that Belgium had swapped places with Netherlands on Google Maps.

Parsons left Ordnance Survey in December 2006 and he was offered a job by Google. Parsons began working at the London office of Google. He also set up his own company Open Geomatics, a strategic consultancy firm focused on the geospatial technology tracking and Neogeography. In 2010, Parsons received an honorary PhD in science from the Kingston University in recognition of his contributions to the field of GIS and to the university.

Parsons oversaw the coordination of Google Maps and Historypin in 2012 in an initiative to recover lost photographs and document the Royal appearances of the Queen on an interactive map of the world provided by Google Maps.

In December 2015, Parsons was invited to deliver a keynote address at the GSDI World Conference in Taiwan.

Parsons is a member of the Board of Directors of the Open Geospatial Consortium. and a fellow of the Royal Geographical Society, an Associate Fellow of the Royal Institute of Navigation and a professional member of the British Computer Society.

In 2017 Parsons was appointed as visiting professor at University College London in the Department of Civil Environmental and Geomatic Engineering.

== Publications ==
- GIS visualisation tools for qualitative spatial information in Innovations in GIS (Vol 2), 201-210 (1995)
- The Essential Guide to GIS in Geoinformation International (1997)
- Next-generation Digital Earth: A position paper from the Vespucci Initiative for the Advancement of Geographic Information Science in International Journal of Spatial Data Infrastructure Research, vol. 3 (2008)
- The Map of the Future May Not Be a Map! in The Cartographic Journal, vol. 50 No.2 (2013)
- Where Is Everywhere: Bringing Location to the Web in IEEE Internet Computing 19(2) :83-87 (March 2015)
- Spatial approaches to information search in Spatial Cognition & Computation, 1-16 (2016)
