= Union of Kingston Students =

- Motto: Support Empower Enrich
- Institution: Kingston University
- Location: Penrhyn Road, Kingston upon Thames, KT1 2EE
- Established: 1947
- Chief Executive: Cat Redding
- Members: 15 000
- Affiliations: National Union of Students
- Website: http://www.kingstonstudents.net

The Union of Kingston Students (UKS) is a students' union that represents and provides services to the near 15 000 students of Kingston University a former polytechnic and now large comprehensive university based in South West London. It is a registered charity and employs around 20 full-time staff and 10 student staff, and has an annual turnover of nearly £2.5m.

== History ==
The Students' Union was first founded in 1947 by soldiers returning from fighting in the Second World War attending the then Kingston Technical Institute. Initially there was little interest in the activities of the Students' Union however by 1955 it had become more active with the Freshers Ball attracting 350 guests. In 1958 students chose to disaffiliate from the NUS due to their strong left wing politics and held their own conference in Bournemouth, but like many students' unions it would later re-affiliate and remains as a member today.

As social activities became more important, a Drama Society was founded in 1959 which continues to operate to this day. Throughout this period Charity week stunts gained press attention following "Screams, roaring rockets, explosions and shouts for help." In 1959 students built a motorized cast-iron bath which they named 'Sambo'. In 1961 they successfully drove it from John O'Groats in Scotland to Land's End in Cornwall, albeit with a slight mishap on the A6 near Penrith where they scraped the sides of two cars standing at traffic lights. Despite the evasive action taken by bath-driver Peter Lackenby; villagers crowded round as two police motor patrolmen, summoned to the scene of the collision, checked the bath's controls, which included motor cycle handlebars, brakes, a horn, windshield, as well as the more usual fittings of plughole and hot and cold taps! The students successfully completed the journey and earned international notoriety as they raised £1000 for the British Empire Cancer Research Fund (almost £18,000 in 2014).

In 1965 another RAG week stunt brought media attention to Kingston when five students raided Benenden in Kent (the private school where Princess Anne was being educated), in order to put up RAG week posters. Following the ensuing outrage the students apologised and were suspended for a week. Further negative attention came when students set up their own pirate radio station "Shameless". Unfortunately the students were identified, arrested and the equipment was smashed. RAG week stunts were ended by the Union and the Principal Dr Lawley shortly thereafter.

In the mid- to late 1960s, Union activities started to become more political. In 1965, 300 students staged a sit down strike over deficiencies in the refectory after not being able to get afternoon tea. In 1968 another protest was held at Tolworth Tower and the Students' Union president was later forced to resign after a no confidence vote for failure to secure improved catering from the guildhall was successful. It was also this year that saw the Union's first full-time President elected when Mr Subir Das was elected in 1968 and in January of this year, the Union was first allowed representation on the Institution's Academic Board. The following year a row over regulations on student representation from the Department of Education and Science was forced, when Kingston Students found that they did not include polytechnic students. Students threatened a vast militant campaign and the department quickly backed down.

In November 1969 the two separate students' unions merger to form a single union alongside the merger of Kingston Art School and Kingston College of Technology. In 1971 the Royal Borough Council's refusal to increase the new Students' Union's allowance after the merger lead to protest marches to Tolworth tower. Lawyers discovered that under the articles of government, allowances could only be paid if Student Union membership was obligatory. Obviously, this ruling affected all polytechnic trainees, so what had started as a local problem rapidly became a national one. Kingston students rammed home their message by boycotting lectures and picketing college buildings. Faced by the Government's resolute response, the students' "work-in" collapsed. Finally, Mrs Margaret Thatcher, the Secretary of State for Education and Science, agreed to amend the regulations. The students, however, remained unimpressed by her proposals and a "Down with Margaret Thatcher" deputation marched to Tolworth Tower in December 1971.

The same year Kingston students also occupied an Architecture studio in support of two staff who resigned after being allegedly `harassed and obstructed’ in their desire to reorganise their courses in an innovatory manner. `The occupation will continue indefinitely’, a student representative asserted confidently. For the rest of the decade a student accommodation crisis continued to rage and "Build new hostels" became the Student Union's main banner cry. Poor library conditions involved the college authorities in another well publicised conflict with the Union: in 1972, student representatives demanded the provision at Penrhyn Road of 200 more seats, air conditioning, doubleglazing, new carpeting and better lighting. Hard-pressed management admitted that due to overcrowding, space earmarked for the library had had to be converted into classrooms [Diary, November 1972]. In a vain effort to alleviate the problem, five more huts were erected on the Penrhyn Road Campus. [Diary, 16 October 1972].

As accommodation continue to be a problem, the Union has been housed in a number and variety of buildings but in 1986 – the Town House opened which to this day houses the Students’ Union offices and bar. In 1987 as cuts really started to bite, student militancy reappeared. Part of the trouble lay in the Polytechnic's insistence that students living in Kingston Hill hostels accept a package including not only rent for their rooms but payment for set meals. Many students worked at other centres and therefore could not eat the meals prescribed by their contract; worse still no refunds were available. Discontent boiled over during February 1987 and students refused to pay rent - the money was placed in a Student Union account until such time as the dispute was resolved - and boycotted and picketed the Kingston Hill canteen. The students wanted management to introduce a pay-as-you-eat system. Although this proved to be impossible, the package was modified to allow students to pay for a reduced number of meals.

The Education Act of 1988 brought further disputes when the Student Union vociferously opposed the ending of local government control of the institution, believing that it ensured at least some measure of democracy [The Richmond & District Comet, 22 January 1988]. Problems at the time were exacerbated by the visit in 1989 of Jusuf Islam, the one time Rock star Cat Stevens, to the Student Union where, it was claimed, he gave vociferous and widely reported support to the proposed execution of Salman Rushdie, author of The Satanic Verses.

On learning in 1992 of the Assistant Director - Ivan Hannaford's intention to retire, students decided to name the union bar at Kingston Hill after him. Ivan Hannaford had been a strong advocate on behalf of the students of the institution in his some 50 years there. It remains known as Hannafords or affectionately as "Hannies". He was said to be both amused and delighted.

In 1994, the Union became known as Kingston University Students' Union (KUSU) following Kingston's elevation to University status. The Union registered as a charity in 2011. In 2015, KUSU rebranded to the Union of Kingston Students (UKS) and moved its offices into the Main building due to the redevelopment of the Town House the following year. Despite controversy, Space Bar was not replaced with a similar facility, leaving Penrhyn Road campus without a Union bar. Today the Union represents over 15,000 students across the university and has an annual turnover of 2.5m.

=== Trustee Board ===
As of 2019 the Trustee Board is composed of:

- President (Union Development Officer)
- Vice President (Welfare Officer)
- Vice President (Activities and Development)
- Vice President (Education Officer)
- 4 Elected Student Trustees
- 3 External Trustees

The Trustee Board is responsible for the Finance, Governance and Strategy of the Union and is the ultimate authority in the Union.

=== Student Council ===
The Student Council is responsible for the representation and policies of the Union. All members sit on the executive committee, and is composed of full time officers, student network reps, course reps and campus reps. Full time officers cannot vote.

=== Staff and management ===
UKS employs around 20 full-time staff and over 20 student staff annually. They are headed by the chief executive officer who has three department managers who report to them:

- Student Voice Manager
- Finance Manager
- Student Opportunities Manager
- Business Development Manager
- Chief Executive Officer

== Student Development ==
The Union of Kingston Students' Student Development Department includes: Societies, Sports, Student Support and Volunteering

=== Sports ===
The Union of Kingston Students runs and administers over 35 sports clubs from typical team sports such as football, rugby and netball to non traditional pursuits such as Sky-diving, Sub-Aqua (Diving) and Snow Sports. Each year Kingston Sport engage over 2000 students in sporting activity and hold large-scale events such as the annual Varsity match against the City University, Tour and the Annual Sports Awards.

The clubs are known as the Kingston Cougars after their mascot Dave "Kingston" Cougar.

=== Societies ===
The Union of Kingston Students runs over 100 societies across a breadth of interests. Many students are members of multiple societies and some societies have in the past achieved memberships of thousands and many still maintain hundreds of members. The larger societies include Kingston University Video Games Society, Kingston University Law Society, Kingston University Wine Society and Kingston University Islamic Society. The societies all operate as component parts of and under the governance structure of the Students' Union albeit with high levels of autonomy.

Societies also run many large-scale events such as the annual society awards and have in the past raised significant amounts of money for charity particular for disaster relief causes.

=== Volunteering ===
The Union of Kingston Students also operates the student and staff volunteering program for the university. UKS has over 400 volunteers each year and is currently operating at capacity. The Union is currently the largest provider of volunteers in the Royal Borough of Kingston upon Thames. Volunteers have been involved with small to large projects including: Hersham Hounds, Scouting and Girl Guiding, as Special Constables in the Metropolitan Police and on large events including the Notting Hill Carnival and the London 2012 Olympic and Paralympic Games. UKS has two award-winning International volunteering trips a year, India and Sri Lanka.
