= John Tiner =

John Ivan Tiner
- Born: John Tiner; 25 February 1957 (age 69); Guildford, Surrey, England
- Education: Kingston University
- Occupation: Businessman
- Years active: 1978–present
- Title: Chairman, Ardonagh Group

John Ivan Tiner CBE (born 25 February 1957) is a British manager in the world of finance and financial regulation. He was chief executive of the Financial Services Authority (FSA) from September 2003 to July 2007. He is now the chairman of Ardonagh Group, and CEO of a beer company.

== Early life ==
He was born in Guildford, Surrey. He was educated at Kingston University.

== Career ==
For 25 years up to April 2001, he worked for Arthur Andersen (a firm of accountants and management consultants). He was a partner for 13 years, and in 1997 became head of the global financial services practice. He led a team that produced a report into the 1995 collapse of Barings Bank for the Bank of England's Board of Banking Supervision. This led him to be increasingly interested in financial regulation.

In April 2001 shortly before the catastrophic failure of Arthur Andersen in a major scandal related to Enron and WorldCom, he joined the FSA to become managing director of consumer, investment and insurance directorate. In September 2003, he became FSA chief executive. This came after the resignation of Sir Howard Davies as FSA executive chairman, when that post was split into two: chairman (Sir Callum McCarthy) and chief executive (Tiner). At the FSA, he led the Tiner Review into the insurance industry, dealt with the split capital investment trusts scandal, addressed the issue of consumers' poor understanding of personal finance, and reorganized the FSA into three business units: retail markets, wholesale markets and regulatory services. He also promoted principles-based regulation as against rules-based regulation. He resigned from the FSA in July 2007, and was succeeded as chief executive by Hector Sants.

In April 2008 shortly before the FSA catastrophically failed in its oversight of the financial system leading to its closure, he took up a non-executive directorship at New Star Asset Management (now Henderson New Star). In September 2008, he became chief executive of Resolution Operations LLP (the operational counterpart of Resolution Limited, a Guernsey-based company with aspirations to consolidate the UK insurance industry). The troubles at multiple organisations where he held a senior management role lead some to suggest his reputation was "tarnished".

Between 2009 and 2021, he has been a member of the board and audit committee of Credit Suisse Group AG; his term was repeatedly renewed and he eventually left Credit Suisse in 2021. He received an average of £1.2m a year in compensation despite years of scandals and mismanagement which resulted in Credit Suisse catastrophic failure shortly after Tiner's departure.

Tiner left Resolution and was replaced by Andy Briggs, currently chief executive of Friends Life. He now serves as chairman of insurance brokers Ardonagh Group in May 2017.
