= Hector Sants =

British investment banker and financial regulator

Sir Hector Sants
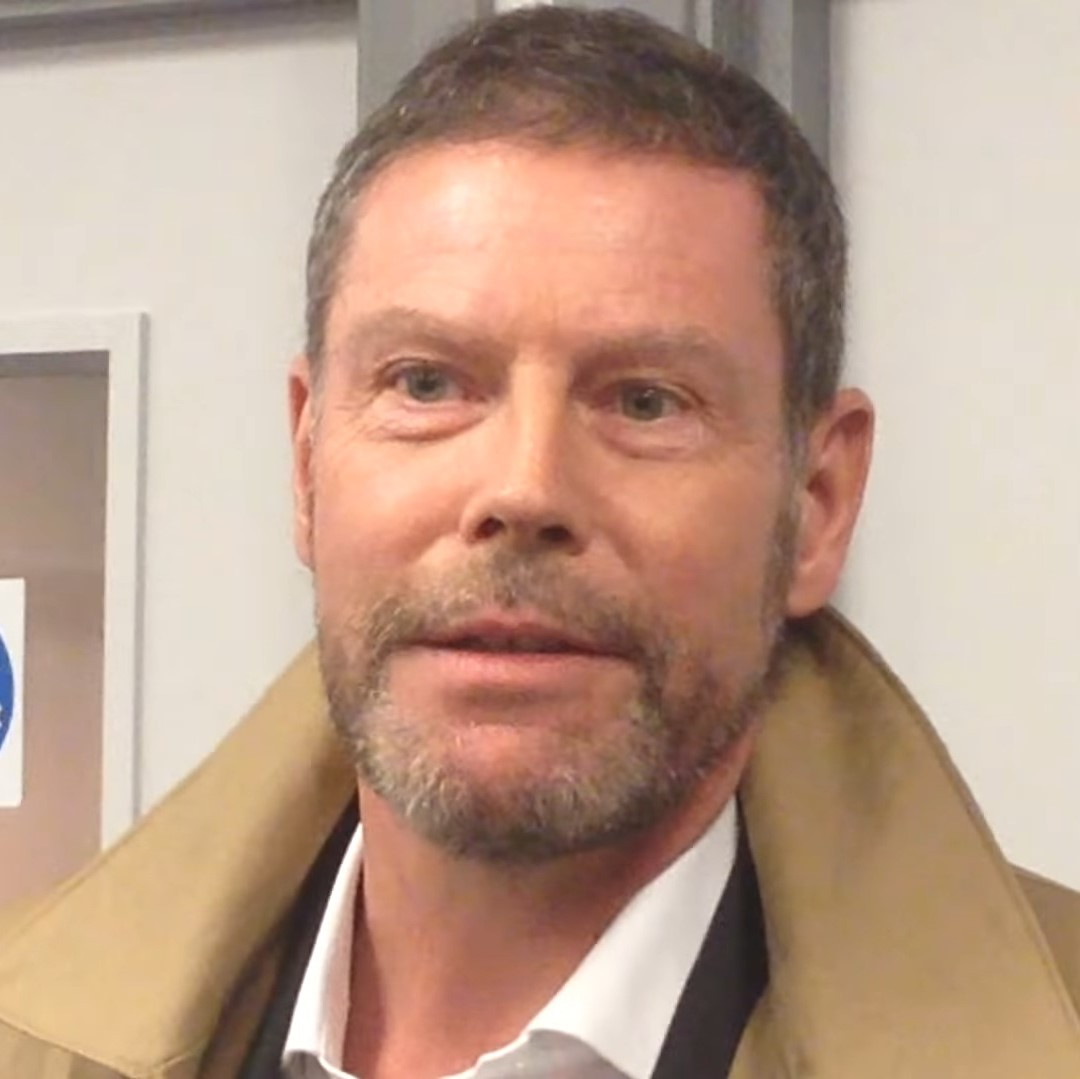
- Sants in 2014

Chief executive officer of the Financial Services Authority
- In office July 2007 – June 2012
- Prime Minister: David Cameron; Gordon Brown
- Preceded by: John Tiner

Personal details
- Born: Hector William Hepburn Sants; 15 December 1955 (age 70)
- Children: 3
- Education: Clifton College
- Alma mater: Corpus Christi College, Oxford (M.A.)
- Occupation: Investment banker
- Awards: Langton Award for Community Service (2016)

Sir Hector William Hepburn Sants (born 15 December 1955) is a British investment banker. He was appointed chief executive officer of the Financial Services Authority in July 2007 and stepped down in June 2012. He took up a new position with Barclays Bank at the end of January 2013, but resigned from the bank on 13 November 2013.

== Education and personal life ==
Hector Sants was educated at Clifton College and Corpus Christi College, Oxford.

Sants is married to his wife Caroline and has three children.

== Career ==
=== Phillips & Drew and UBS ===
Sants joined the Research Department of the stockbroking partnership Phillips & Drew in 1977, and from 1978 to 1983 he was the Senior Analyst responsible for Food Manufacturing and Overseas Traders sectors. He became a partner in 1984.

In December 1984 he moved to New York where he was a director of Phillips & Drew International, the New York subsidiary. In 1985 he became managing director of that operation. Phillips & Drew International was subsequently acquired by Union Bank of Switzerland and Sants was appointed First Vice President, responsible for the international securities activities of UBS Securities.

In January 1988, Sants returned to London where he became responsible for the worldwide coordination of research for the UBS investment banking operation. In September 1988, he became Vice Chairman of UBS Phillips & Drew Securities Ltd, renamed UBS Limited in 1993, initially responsible for all equity and equity-linked secondary activities in London and later, from 1996, responsible for all equity business in Europe, Africa and the Middle East. In 1994, with the formation of the Global Equity Management Committee of which Sants was a founding member, he also took collective responsibility for UBS's worldwide equity operations. In December 1997 he became Global Head of Equities but continued to retain direct responsibility for the European product. From 1998 he was also on the Executive Management Committee for all UBS wholesale activities in Europe.

In March 1998, as a result of the merger of UBS with Swiss Bank Corporation, Sants became Joint Head of European Equities at investment bank Warburg Dillon Read, which itself had been created by SBC in 1997 as a result of acquisitions and mergers.

=== DLJ and CSFB ===
Sants left in July 1998 to join Donaldson, Lufkin & Jenrette. At DLJ he was global head of international (non-US) equities and chairman of Donaldson, Lufkin & Jenrette International Securities Ltd.

In October 2000, DLJ merged with Credit Suisse First Boston, and Sants became a vice chairman with responsibility for the equity businesses outside of the US. In November 2001 he became chief executive officer for the European, Middle East and Africa region and joined the executive board and the operating committee of Credit Suisse First Boston.

=== FSA ===
In May 2004, Sants joined the Financial Services Authority as the managing director responsible for Wholesale and Institutional Markets. He was appointed FSA Chief Executive in July 2007.

In December 2008, Sants appeared before a Treasury Select Committee inquiry about the FSA. Committee Chairman John McFall commented "Your long answers are not helping us". At the end of the hearing, however, he added "you did very well".

=== Barclays ===
In December 2012, it was announced that Sants would take up the position of Head of Compliance and Government and Regulatory Relations with Barclays Bank from January 2013. It had previously emerged that after Sants stepped down from the FSA in June, in the same month the FSA fined Barclays £59.5m for manipulating the interbank borrowing rate Libor (Libor scandal). In September 2012, Sants had released correspondence with Barclays to Andrew Tyrie MP, chairman of the Treasury Select Committee, in which Sants had raised profound concerns about the culture and governance arrangements at Barclays when Bob Diamond was appointed as the bank's chief executive in 2010. Antony Jenkins, who replaced Diamond as Barclays CEO, was keen to recruit Sants to bolster the status of Barclays' compliance and regulatory oversight functions and make it integral to the way the bank operates.

On 15 October 2013, Barclays announced that Sants was taking three months' sick leave as he was suffering from "exhaustion and stress", and he resigned from the bank on 13 November 2013.

=== Oliver Wyman ===
In July 2015, Sir Hector Sants joined Oliver Wyman, the international management consulting firm, as a Partner and Vice Chairman. In November 2015, Hector Sants led a review for the British Bankers Association (BBA) into the competitiveness of the UK banking industry. In September 2016, Sir Hector Sants co-led a research commissioned by TheCityUK on the potential impact of Brexit on the financial sector.

=== Other appointments ===
Concurrently with his main career, Sants has held non-executive directorships at organisations including the Securities and Futures Authority (no longer extant as such), the London Stock Exchange and LCH.Clearnet. He has also served on the Practitioners Panel of the FSA, the Securities and Investments Board, the initial committee to start up CREST, the Financial Law Panel, the Practitioner Investment Advisory Committee to the Public Trustee Office and the LIBA Chairman's Committee. Sants is also the former Chair of StepChange Debt Charity. On 1 January 2022 Sants took up the role of Chair of the Oxford Diocesan Board of Finance, the governing body of the finances of the Church of England's Diocese of Oxford.

== Honours ==
Sants was knighted for services to financial services and regulation in the 2013 New Year Honours.

In 2016, he was awarded the Langton Award for Community Service by the Archbishop of Canterbury "for his contribution to the Church of England’s work for the common good in all communities".

Sir Hector Sants is a Bynum Tudor Visiting Fellow at Kellogg College, Oxford.
