= Richard Bryant (photographer) =

British photographer

- Born: Richard Bruce Nasmyth Bryant; 9 March 1947 (age 79); England
- Education: Kingston Polytechnic
- Occupation: Photographer
- Website: www.richardbryantphoto.com

Richard Bruce Nasmyth Bryant (born 9 March 1947) is a British architectural photographer.

== Early life and education ==
Bryant first became interested in photography during his childhood, when he received a passed-on camera from his father who was a keen amateur photographer. He spent his school and college days experimenting with different types of photography.

He studied architecture at Kingston Polytechnic and graduated in 1975, when he joined a small firm of London architects. Soon after, he decided to pursue a career in photography. He had experimented with different types of photography, and was approached by New York-based magazines (House and Garden magazine) who sent him to interpret numerous architectural projects around the world.

== Photographic career ==
Much of Bryant's photography falls under the categories of architecture, culture, London, lifestyle and luxury, as well as working with luxury brands.

His work can be found in the Canadian Centre for Architecture, Architecture Museum in Frankfurt and Victoria and Albert Museum in London.

Bryant has been awarded several times for his photography, had his images exhibited at the Royal Academy of Arts and has published a number of books that contain his photographs. These books include London Deluxe (2008); Carlo Scarpa, Gipsoteca Canoviana, Possagno (2002); A Garden & Three Houses (1999); Sir John Soane's Museum, London (1995); The New Moderns (1993); Living Museum (1993) and Stansted (1992). London Deluxe allows the reader to travel across London following villas and gardens in Notting Hill, through to the historic monuments of Greenwich. Bryant’s photographs capture every aspect of the city of London - from the architectural buildings within Westminster such as the Houses of Parliament and the London Eye – to Fenchurch and streetscapes unchanged for centuries.

Bryant is the founding photographer and currently the partner for the photo archive company Arcaid Images, which he set up with his wife Lynne in 1982.

== Awards ==
Bryant was the first photographer to be granted an honorary fellowship of the RIBA in 1991. In 1996, he was the prime focus of a television programme and was invited to represent Britain and exhibit his own work at the Venice Biennale. A year later in 1998, he was awarded an honorary title in design at Kingston University.

In 2000, Bryant was commissioned by the UK Royal Mail to produce an image for the first class ‘arts and crafts’ series of stamps for the millennium.

Somerset House interviewed Bryant about his work in his book The London Deluxe and then hosted an exhibition of some of the images in 2008.

Bryant also received a prize for the 1989 Daniel Katz Award for Architectural Photography. He established the architectural photography awards for Arcaid Images in 2014, which was presented by architects Richard Rogers and Terry Farrell.
