= Ratheesan Yoganathan =

British entrepreneur (born 1975)

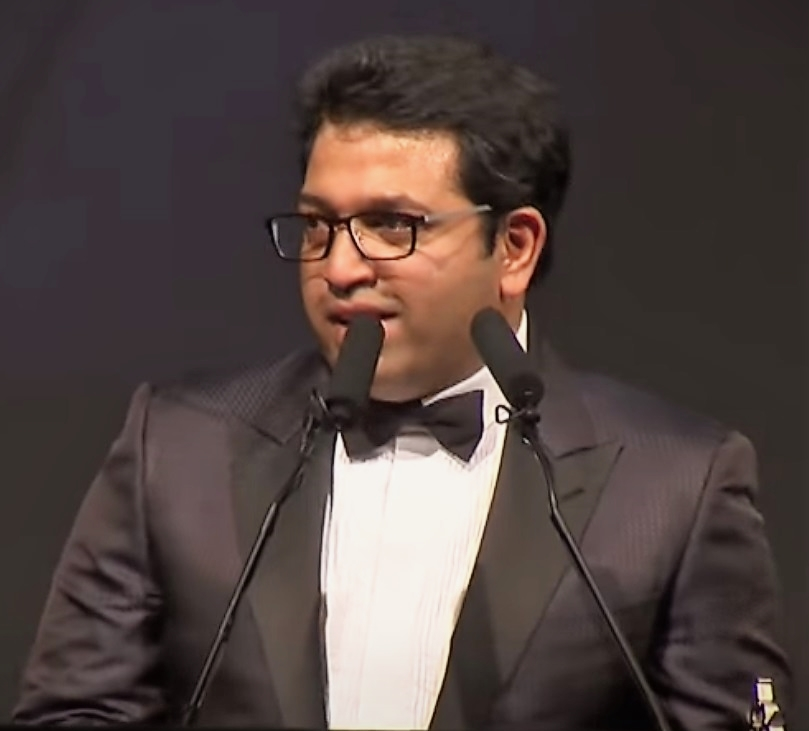
- Yoganathan speaks at The Asian Awards in 2019
- Born: 6 December 1975 (age 50); Jaffna, Northern Province, Sri Lanka
- Education: Havering College, Hornchurch; Kingston University(B.Sc.)
- Occupation: Entrepreneur
- Known for: Co-founder and ex Chairman of Lebara Group
- Title: Chairman of Lebara Group

Ratheesan Yoganathan (born 6 December 1975) is a British entrepreneur who, with Rasiah Ranjith Leon and Baskaran Kandiah, is best known as the co-founder of Lebara Group. On 10 August 2012 he took on the role of ex-chairman of Lebara Group and returned as CEO in March 2014. He owns about one third of the company's stock. He read aeronautical engineering at Kingston University.

== Career ==
Ratheesan Yoganathan worked at an ICS outlet selling call-time cards. Later he managed the pricing department and worked in sales and marketing departement. At ICS, he made friends with two other Tamil colleagues, Rasiah Ranjith Leon and Baskaran Kandiah, who eventually became his business partners.

== Business ==
In 2001, Ratheesan Yoganathan, Rasiah Ranjith Leon and Baskaran Kandiah founded the Lebara Group. Yoganathan ran Lebara as the CEO till August 2012 when it hired David Moffatt who was appointed Chief Executive Officer, effective 10 August 2012. Thereafter Yoganathan became the Chairman of Lebara Group, before returning as CEO in early 2014.

== Charity ==
Ratheesan Yoganathan along with co-founders Rasiah Ranjith Leon and Baskaran Kandiah started Lebara Foundation, a charitable venture in 2005. His next big ambition is to expand Lebara Foundation, which is already building a community with homes, a school and a clinic for local and displaced children in Chennai, southern India. To fund it, he plans to donate half his wealth to the foundation.

== Other interests ==
As a strong believer in supporting young entrepreneurial talent, Yoganathan officially launched "The Entrepreneurial Way" at Cass Business School, London, in December, 2012. The Entrepreneurial Way offers students and recent graduates since 2005, the opportunity to pitch their business ideas to a panel of judges - including Ratheesan Yoganathan - for investment, funding and additional support, such as mentoring. The scheme offers potential entrepreneurs practical advice on how to develop their business ideas and make them work in the real world.

Business positions
Preceded by Company founded	CEO of Lebara Group; 2001–2012	Succeeded by David Moffatt
Preceded by Role Created	Chairman of Lebara Group; 2012–present	Succeeded by Incumbent
