= Lebara =

British telecommunications company

- Lebara logo
- Industry: Telecommunications
- Founded: September 2001; 25 years ago
- Founder: Baskaran Kandiah; Rasiah Ranjith Leon; Ratheesan Yoganathan
- Headquarters: 5th Floor, Broadway House, 5 Appold Street, London, EC2A 2DA, England, United Kingdom
- Area served: United Kingdom; Australia; Saudi Arabia; Netherlands; France; Spain; Denmark; Switzerland; Germany; Nigeria
- Key people: Stephen Shurrock (CEO)
- Products: Mobile telecommunications services
- Revenue: ▲€513 million (2023)
- Owner: Waterland Private Equity
- Number of employees: 400 (2016)
- Parent: VIEO B.V.
- Website: www.lebara.com

Lebara is a British telecommunications company providing services using the mobile virtual network operator (MVNO) business model in the United Kingdom, France, Denmark, the Netherlands, Germany, Saudi Arabia, Spain, Switzerland, Nigeria and Australia. Lebara provides pay-as-you-go and contract-based mobile SIM cards in these countries, and its brand is also used under license in four other countries.

== History ==
Lebara was founded in 2001 by UK-based Ratheesan Yoganathan, Rasiah Ranjith Leon and Baskaran Kandiah. The name Lebara was coined from the first two letters of each of the founders' names. At launch, the company's initial product was international telephone calling cards, sold through independent mobile phone shops. In 2004, Lebara launched its first mobile virtual network, a low-cost international service in the Netherlands, selling SIM cards using mobile carrier Telfort, a subsidiary of KPN. After finding success, it subsequently launched operations in other European countries including the UK (2007), France, Spain, Switzerland, Germany (2010) and Denmark.

Lebara's Swiss operation (Lebara GmbH, Zurich) was sold on 1 July 2013 to Sunrise Communications.

In September 2017, Lebara Group B.V. was sold to Switzerland-based Palmarium Advisors AG. The Spanish operation of Lebara (Lebara España SL) was sold to MASMOVIL Group in November 2018. In 2019, bondholders of Lebara (under holding company Vieo B.V.) took control of the company.

Lebara was sold to Waterland Private Equity in August 2024.

On Thursday, September 17, 2026, Lebara got presence and commenced its operations in Nigeria.

== Operations ==
The company currently operates in the UK, France, Denmark, the Netherlands and Germany; as of 2023, it had at least four million customers. It has also entered into brand license agreements for the use of its trademarks in Australia, Switzerland, Saudi Arabia and Spain.

In 2017 Lebara launched its first postpaid monthly contract SIMs in the Netherlands, as part of a move to appeal to a wider customer base.

As of 2017, Lebara focused on the international calling market as well as offering SIM-only plans and post-pay services. Lebara plans to offer 5G services as these become available.

In 2026, Lebara began its operations in Nigeria.

Country	Partner network
Australia	Vodafone
Denmark	Telenor
France	SFR (Orange France until June 2024)
Germany	O2 (Telekom until May 2022)
Netherlands	KPN
Saudi Arabia	Mobily
Spain	Vodafone
Switzerland	Sunrise
United Kingdom	Vodafone
Nigeria	Airtel

== Ratings and reviews ==
Lebara Mobile has been reviewed for its competitive pricing and international call services, with mixed feedback on customer service and network reliability.
