= Walter Scott (American cricketer) =

American cricketer

Personal information
- Full name: Walter Scott
- Born: April 19, 1864/8 (Note: ESPNcricinfo and CricketArchive give Scott's year of birth as 1864 and 1868, respectively. This is perhaps a result of his Wisden obituary, which contradictorily gives 39 as his age at his death in 1907, but 1864 as his year of birth. If the 1864 date is correct, Joseph Scott is his younger (rather than older) brother.); Huntingdon, Pennsylvania, U.S.
- Died: October 24, 1907 (aged 39–43); Colorado Springs, Colorado, U.S.
- Batting: Right-handed
- Bowling: Right-arm slow
- Role: All-rounder
- Relatives: J. A. Scott (brother)

Domestic team information
- Years: Team
- 1885–1893: Philadelphia (Gentlemen of Philadelphia)

Career statistics
Competition	FC
Matches	5
Runs scored	88
Batting average	9.77
100s/50s	0/0
Top score	31
Balls bowled	338
Wickets	10
Bowling average	25.00
5 wickets in innings	0
10 wickets in match	0
Best bowling	4/52
Catches/stumpings	4/–
- Source: CricketArchive, August 6, 2013

Walter Scott (19 April 1868 – October 24, 1907) was an American cricketer who played several first-class matches for Philadelphia-based teams during the late 19th century. A native of Pennsylvania, he began playing for New York teams as a teenager, but was best known for his career with the Philadelphia-based Belmont Cricket Club, which extended from 1883 to 1894, and included eleven seasons of Halifax Cup matches. Often playing for Belmont under the captaincy of his older brother, Joseph Scott (Joseph Allison Scott; 1865–1909), Scott was a right-handed all-rounder, and, although largely unsuccessful at first-class level, was one of the best players in Philadelphia for several seasons. Scott died of pneumonia October 24, 1907, in Colorado Springs.

== Early career ==
Scott was born in Huntingdon, Pennsylvania, to U.S. Senator John Scott (1824–1896) and Anne Elizabeth Eyster (1824–1911). His first recorded matches were for New York-based teams—he represented a Brooklyn representative side during the 1882 season, and played for Manhattan over the following seven seasons. From the 1883 season, he appeared for the Philadelphia-based Belmont Cricket Club, originally only in juniors and second XI, but later for the team's senior side in the Halifax Cup, at the time arguably the most prestigious club competition in the United States. In the shortened 1885 tournament, Scott led Belmont's batting averages. After good form in several other matches, including a haul of 7/14 for a Young Philadelphia side against Chicago and a score of 73 runs for Belmont against Baltimore, he made his first-class debut for Gentleman of Philadelphia against a professional side ostensibly representing the rest of the country. On debut, he made seven runs across his two innings, and took 1/23 while bowling, with his sole wicket being that of the opposing captain, Henry Tyers, for 118 runs.

== Later career and English tour ==
Scott's next appearance at first-class level came the following season, against a touring English side, and he again took a single wicket while failing with the bat. However, few of the Americans were successful, and the Philadelphians lost by an innings and 16 runs. In that year's Halifax Cup, played only between the Belmont, Germantown, and Young America Cricket Clubs, he was one of the most successful players, leading his club's batting and bowling averages. Right-handed, Scott was an all-rounder, excelling at both batting and bowling—in 1887 he was adjudged best bowler in the competition and the following season named the best batsman. His older brothers, J. Irvin (James Irvin Scott; 1863–1930) and Joseph Allison Scott, both also played for Belmont during the same period, and Joseph captained the club on several occasions. A student at the University of Pennsylvania, Scott played cricket for the university regularly during the late 1880s. In the 1887 edition of the university's semi-annual match against Haverford College, the two Scott brothers, Joseph and Walter, combined for a 168-run partnership, with Walter finishing on 115 not out, his first recorded century.

A Gentlemen of Philadelphia team toured England in 1889, with Scott a key member, although no matches were granted first-class status. He excelled with both bat and ball on tour, scoring two centuries—125 runs against Gentlemen of Liverpool and 142 runs against Gentlemen of Surrey, which also included a ten-wicket haul. He finished the tour second in the team's batting averages, to George Patterson. Scott began to play less frequently after the tour, although he played two further first-class matches for Philadelphia when a team led by Lord Hawke toured at the end of the 1891 season. In the first match, he took 4/52, his best first-class bowling figures, and then, being used as an opening batsman, scored 31 runs in the second match, his highest first-class score. The second match was more notable for the performance of Australian Sammy Woods, who took match figures of 15/87. Scott's final match for Philadelphia came against the touring Australians, and his last Halifax Cup matches came the following season. He had originally been named in the Philadelphians' team for their 1897 tour of England, but he withdrew, and was replaced by Herbert Clark. Scott died of pneumonia in Colorado Springs in October 1907, though it is unclear in what circumstances he had come to Colorado. His obituary in the Wisden Cricketers' Almanack described him as "a careful and good class batsman, a fine field, a very useful slow bowler".
