= History of cricket in the United States =

The history of United States cricket begins in the 18th century. Among early Americans, cricket was as popular a bat-and-ball game as baseball. Though Americans never played cricket in great numbers, the game grew for some time. Around the time of the United States Civil War, the game began competing with baseball for participants, but then slowly declined in popularity. This was followed again by a brief golden age with the Philadelphian cricket team. This lasted until roughly the start of World War I; at this time, cricket again became less popular.

In the latter part of the 20th century, immigrants from cricket-playing nations in South Asia and the West Indies helped spark a resurgence in the game's popularity. This led to participation and success in several International Cricket Council events. In 2007, the United States of America Cricket Association was suspended by the ICC because of problems with its administration, but was again recognized beginning in 2008.

The USACA was expelled as the recognized national governing body by the ICC during its 2017 AGM. USA Cricket is now the ICC-recognized national governing body, and is responsible for administering Minor League Cricket, which is currently the highest level of domestic competition in the USA. It is played in the relatively recently invented T20 format of cricket, with games lasting roughly three hours, separating it from the longer-format cricket played throughout most of American history.

== Early developments ==
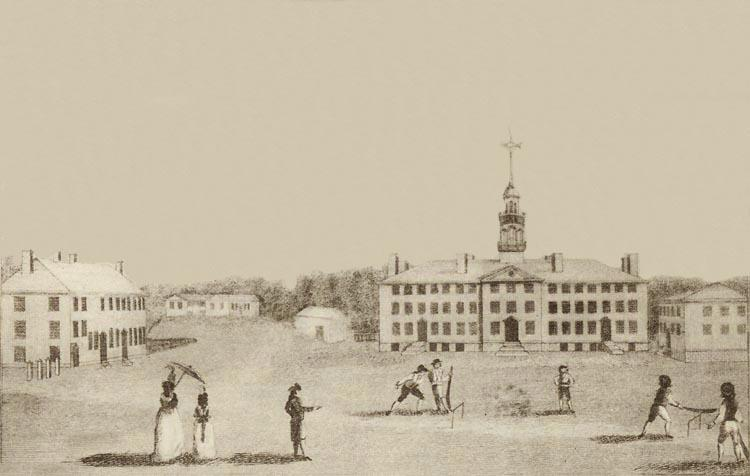
A 1793 depiction of a match being played in front of Dartmouth College

Cricket was being played in British North America by at least the beginning of the 18th century. The earliest definite reference to American cricket is in the 1709 diaries of William Byrd of Westover on his James River estates in Virginia. By the American Revolution, the game was so popular that the troops at Valley Forge played matches; George Washington himself joined in at least one game of "wicket." John Adams told Congress that if leaders of simple cricket clubs could be called "presidents," the leader of the new nation might be called something more grand. Cricket continued to develop slowly as a recreational sport as America gained independence in 1783.

A variation of cricket known as wicket was played before the 20th century in the New England area.

== History following independence ==
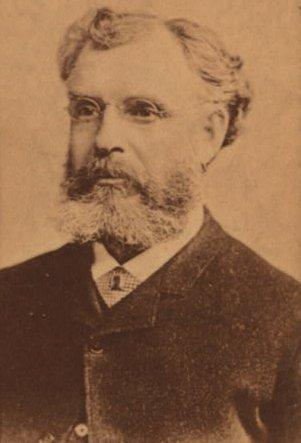
Harry Wright helped to bring cricket strategies to baseball

Cricket enjoyed its greatest popularity along the East Coast corridor between Philadelphia and New York. A contemporary report notes that upwards of 5,000 people played the game in those cities. Cricket was played at Haverford College briefly in the late 1830s, and was revived there in 1856. The Philadelphia Cricket Club was founded in 1854 and the Germantown and Young America clubs in 1855. By this time, Philadelphia had become the unofficial "Cricket Capital of America."

The United States participated in the first international cricket match, which saw St George's Cricket Club play Canada on 24 September 1844, at the former Bloomingdale Park in Manhattan. The match was attended by some 10,000 spectators. It is today "the longest international rivalry in cricket, in fact in any sport." Wagers of around $120,000 were placed on the outcome of the match.

As late as 1855, the New York press was still devoting more space to coverage of cricket than to baseball. In the mid-19th century, the sport was played in approximately 125 cities in 22 states. Roughly 500 officially established clubs existed and it is probable that in 1860 there were 10,000 boys and men in America who had actively played the sport for at least a season. Abraham Lincoln, later to be president, had watched two American cities play each other in an 1849 cricket match.

Sides from England toured the US and Canada after the English cricket seasons of 1859, 1868 and 1872, in tours organized as commercial ventures. The 1859 team comprised six players from the All England Eleven and six from the United All England Eleven, and was captained by George Parr. They played five matches, winning them all. There were no first-class fixtures. The match at New York attracted a crowd that was claimed to be 10,000, all that the ground would hold.

The 1868 tourists were led by Edgar Willsher and those of 1872–73 by R.A. Fitzgerald. The latter side included W.G.Grace.

Most of the matches of these early English touring teams were played "against odds", that is to say the home team was permitted to have more than eleven players (usually twenty-two) in order to make a more even contest.

=== Rise of baseball ===
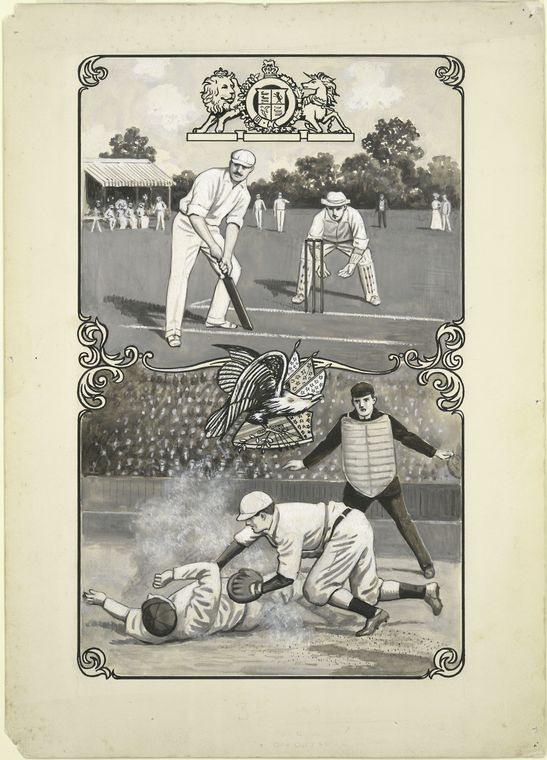
A depiction of cricket (top) and baseball (bottom)

In spite of all this American growth in the game, it was slowly losing ground to a newcomer. In many cities, local cricket clubs were contributing to their own demise by encouraging crossover to the developing game of baseball. After the United States Civil War the Cincinnati Red Stockings brought a talented young bowler from the St. George's Cricket Club in New York to serve as a player and manager of the team. Harry Wright applied the "scientific" batting and specialized placement of fielders that he had learned in cricket to his new sport. This development was instrumental in creating the Cincinnati team's undefeated 1869 season. It also helped to secure the place of baseball as one of the most popular sports in the country.

It may have been during the Civil War that baseball secured its place as America's game. An army making a brief stop at a location could easily organise a game of baseball on almost any clear patch of ground, while cricket required a carefully prepared pitch. After the Civil War, baseball became a much more organized sport than cricket in America, with more money and competition available to baseball players across the country; thus, baseball began to poach players and administrators from the world of cricket. Nick Young, who served for 25 years as the president of the National League, was originally a successful cricketer. It was not until the Civil War that he took up baseball because "it looked like cricket for which his soul thirsted."

It has been suggested that the fast-paced quick play of baseball was more appealing to Americans than the technical slower game of cricket, which at the time was played over a much longer duration than baseball; other reasons for cricket's demise include Americans' desire to have some type of national game distinct from the games of their former colonial master, and cricket clubs for the English-American elite rejecting Irish, Italian and German immigrants from play. Some attempts were made to nativize cricket in a way that would reduce its length and other perceived disadvantages relative to baseball; one example of this was wicket, an American variation of cricket which could be played in an afternoon. However, the natural tendency toward baseball was compounded by terrible American defeats at the hands of a traveling English side in 1859, which may have caused Americans to think that they would never be successful at this English game. By the end of the Civil War, most cricket fans had given up their hopes of broad-based support for the game. Baseball filled the role of the "people's game" and cricket became an amateur game for gentlemen.

== Rise of amateur cricket ==
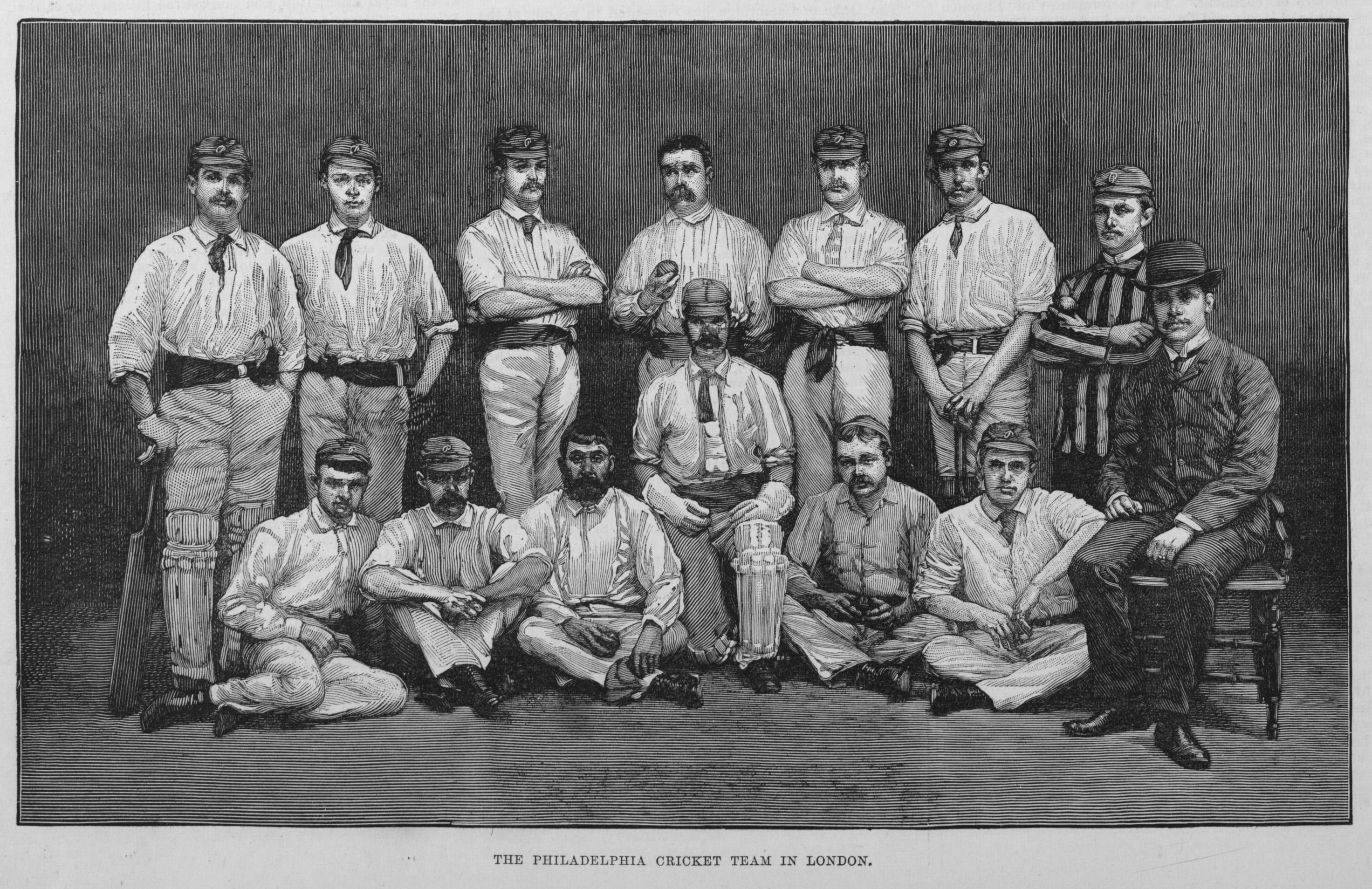
The Philadelphian cricket team, shown here on an 1884 tour of England, were the premier American cricket team for several decades after the US Civil War

Following the Civil War, cricket grew into an amateur sport with much less broad appeal than it had had before. This manifestation can be seen in the foundation of the Staten Island Cricket and Baseball Club. The club was to be based on "the broadest and most liberal interpretation of the terms 'gentlemen' and amateur." They were not that interested in playing baseball, but in founding a more responsive club in the area than the St George's Cricket Club. The members of the Seabright Lawn Tennis Club became so interested in cricket that they convinced club officials to sod their cricket ground with turf imported from England and had the name of the club changed to the Seabright Lawn Tennis and Cricket Club in 1885.

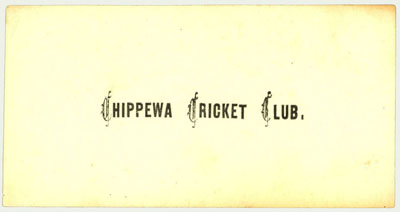
Calling card for the Philadelphia-area Chippewa Cricket Club card, circa 1875.

Nowhere was this new trend in cricket more evident than in Philadelphia. Philadelphia is typically considered to be the center of North American cricket, with a long history of teams and matches. In 1865 a group of young people in that city founded the Merion Cricket Club. They were very emphatic about the purity of the sport and thwarted early attempts by some to convert the club into a baseball club. In the end, the club members passed a resolution that the remaining baseball equipment "be sold off as quickly as possible" to guarantee the purpose of the club. Following the lead of New York and Philadelphia, other cities saw new clubs form. These included St Louis, Boston, Detroit, and Baltimore.

=== Intercollegiate level ===
Haverford College formed a cricket team in 1833, generally accepted as the first cricket club exclusively for Americans. Haverford and the University of Pennsylvania formed a strong rivalry, with the first match played on May 7, 1864, believed to be start of the third-oldest intercollegiate sporting contest in America, after the 1852 Harvard-Yale crew and 1859 Amherst-Williams baseball matches. Haverford and Penn then proceeded to play each other for three consecutive years until 1869, when the Haverford faculty banned cricket away from their college grounds. From 1875 and through 1880, Haverford College, Columbia College and University of Pennsylvania fielded a varsity elevens, which played a few matches each year against each other and other club teams.

The post-Civil War decades saw an increase in cricket-playing at the intercollegiate level, and it looked like cricket might expand beyond its strongholds at Haverford College and the University of Pennsylvania. In 1881 delegates from several collegiate cricket clubs, including Harvard University, Columbia University, Princeton College (then known as College of New Jersey), University of Pennsylvania and Trinity College, joined to form The Intercollegiate Cricket Association. During the 44 years that The Intercollegiate Cricket Association existed (1881 through 1924) Penn won The Intercollegiate Cricket Association championship (the de facto national championship) 23 times (3 shared with Haverford and Harvard, 1 shared with Haverford and Cornell, and 1 shared with just Haverford), Haverford won such championship 19 times (3 shared with Penn and Harvard, 1 shared with Penn and Cornell, and 1 shared with Penn), and Harvard won it 6 times, none after 1899 (3 shared with Haverford and Penn). The group was plagued by troubles and withdrawals. Haverford College and Cornell University later joined the ICA, but Yale University and Johns Hopkins University never got around to fielding teams. The ICA lasted until 1924 when it crowned its last champion. These collegiate clubs generally drew their talent from pools at secondary schools which also fielded team and played in interscholastic competitions in this period.

In July 1895 an international cricket match between Canada and the United States was played on the Manheim grounds in Germantown section of Philadelphia with six of the United States team being Penn student athletes and, in September of that year, past and then current members of Penn's varsity cricket team played past and then current members of the English cricket teams of Oxford and Cambridge resulting in Penn defeating the Oxford-Cambridge team by one hundred runs. This was not surprising as in the last two and a half decades of the 19th century and first decade of the 20th century, Philadelphia was the center of cricket in the United States Cricket had gained in popularity among the upper class from their travels abroad and cricket clubs sprung up all across the Eastern Seaboard (even today Philadelphia still has three cricket clubs: the Philadelphia Cricket Club, the Merion Cricket Club and the Germantown Cricket Club).

=== Philadelphian cricket ===
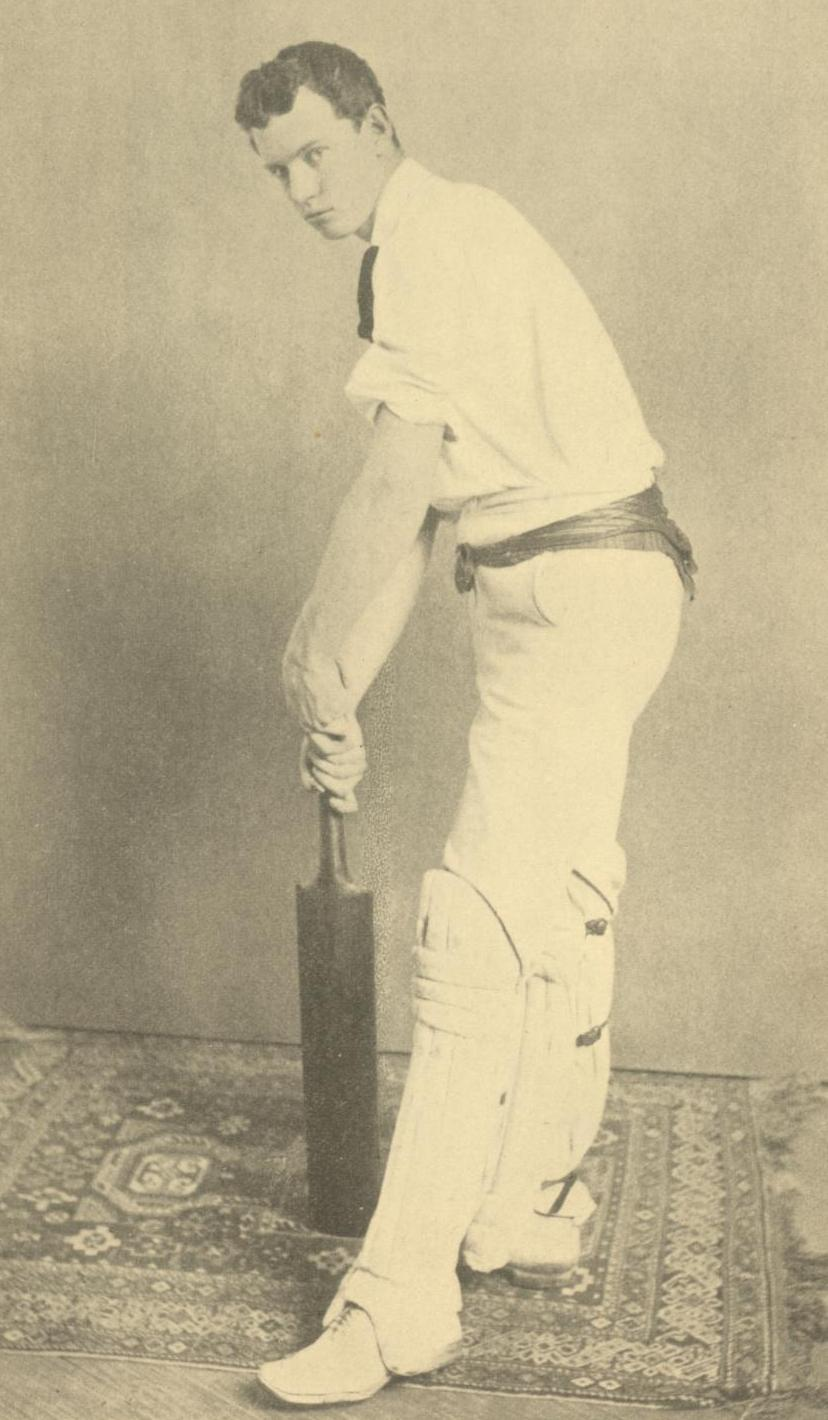
George Stuart Patterson still holds the North American batting record with 271

The Philadelphian cricket team represented the city in first-class cricket between 1878 and 1913. The team was composed of players from the four chief cricket clubs in Philadelphia: Germantown, Merion, Belmont, and Philadelphia. Players from smaller clubs, such as Tioga and Moorestown, and local colleges, such as Haverford, also played for the Philadelphians. Over its 35 years, the team played in 88 first-class cricket matches. Of those, 29 were won, 45 were lost, 13 were drawn and one game was abandoned before completion. The "Gentlemen of Philadelphia" were able to win at least a match or two from all of the foreign sides that visited. They beat Australia's test team by an innings on two separate occasions, in 1893 and 1896. Throughout their first-class period of play, the Philadelphians produced such cricketers as Bart King, George Patterson, and John Lester.

The success of the team and of the sport itself in Philadelphia was the result of broad support from the citizens of the city. Crowds of several thousand fans "ranging from millionaires, coaching parties, and box holders to newsboys" routinely filled the stands at the big four clubs during international matches. These matches were also widely reported in local newspapers. Unlike the other regional pockets of cricket enthusiasm across the country, the sport maintained is popularity for almost two decades into the twentieth century.

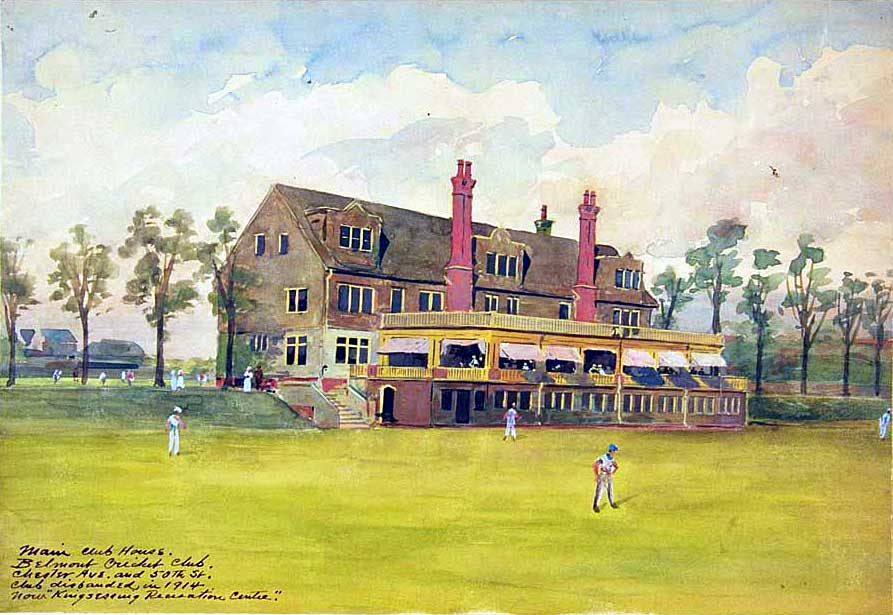
Painting of the Belmont Cricket clubhouse

In 1897, the Gentlemen of Philadelphia were able to launch its first strictly first-class tour of England. This came about after many years of planning. This tour was a very ambitious one for the Americans. They had last toured the British Isles in 1889. Though the results may have been less satisfactory than hoped for by promoters, the tour was arranged mainly for educational purposes and few of those on the American side expected to win many matches. The 1897 schedule included all of the top county cricket teams, the Oxford and Cambridge University teams, the Marylebone Cricket Club, and two other sides, though only a few of the counties thought it worthwhile to put their best elevens onto the field. While it initially aroused some curiosity, many English fans lost interest until Bart King and the Philadelphians met the full Sussex team at Brighton on 17 June. In the first innings, King proved his batting worth on a fourth-wicket stand of 107 runs with John Lester. He then took 7 wickets for 13 runs and the team dismissed Sussex for 46 in less than an hour. In the second innings, King took 6 for 102 and helped the Philadelphians to a victory by 8 wickets.

The Philadelphians again took King and his teammates to England in 1903. On this tour, the team rarely found itself outmatched. By the end of the tour, some English observers were comparing the Philadelphian team to some of the Australian sides that they had seen. One of the highlights of the tour was the win over Gloucestershire by an innings and 26 runs. This was the worst defeat ever by an American side over an English county side. The Americans back home believed that this was the country's chance to burst onto the world cricket stage. Unfortunately, this was followed by a relatively poor showing in 1908. The only bright spot of this tour was Bart King's capture of the season bowling record. His record of 11.01 was not bettered until 1958 when Les Jackson of Derbyshire posted an average of 10.99.

== Decline of popularity ==
Even as the Philadelphians were touring England in 1908, grassroots support for cricket in their home city was waning. Many professionals began to fill their leisure time with other activities, such as golf and tennis. The game failed to align itself with the growing Olympic movement, despite invitations to participate from the organizers of the 1904 Summer Olympics in St. Louis. From around 1905, there was a decline in the number of matches held, and some of Philadelphia's great clubs closed due to a shortage of members. The last first-class match was played there in 1913, and Bart King's own Belmont Cricket Club sold its grounds and disbanded the following year. The game was still being played at Haverford College at a high standard at least as late as 1925, when a team from the college visited England and played a number of English public schools. Haverford College continues to field a cricket team and its last tour to England was in 2019.

Another blow to cricket in the United States was the formation of the Imperial Cricket Conference in 1909. As the name implied, this was meant to be an organization for cricketing nations within the British Empire. Countries such as Australia and South Africa were able to continue playing internationally, while the United States was left out. Although commentator Robert Waller predicted that cricket "had taken so deep a root in Philadelphia that it could never be uprooted," the lack of support and international apathy caused an irreversible decline. The sport's negative association with foreign heritage was strong enough that in 1923, the city of Seattle, fearing that its residents were becoming too similar to their nearby Canadian neighbors, implemented a requirement for approval to be obtained for cricket to be played in public parks.

== Slow resurgence ==
In 1886 the all white West Indian team toured North America. When George Wright donated the West Indian CC cricket gear in 1892, black cricketers on the East Coast pioneered the integration of sport while baseball was played on a segregated basis. Black involvement in cricket was under reported in the 1890s with Philadelphia aristocratic cricket garnering most coverage.

In the second half of the twentieth century, immigrants to the United States from traditional cricket strongholds such as South Asia and the West Indies helped to stimulate the growth of the game. The first match televised in the United States was one between the Corinthians and Hollywood in 1958. Cricket received a boost in the United States in 1959 when President Dwight D. Eisenhower attended a cricket match at Karachi's National Cricket Ground. In 1961, an expatriate Englishman, John Marder, helped to establish the United States of America Cricket Association. He also helped to re-establish the series between the United States and Canada that began in 1844. Cricket also gained ground in American collegiate settings during this period. Again, most of the play was done by foreign students visiting the United States to study. This slow but steady resurgence in the game has not spread in great numbers to the mainstream American population.

== Modern developments ==
The United States of America Cricket Association was admitted as an associate member of the International Cricket Conference in 1965, a dramatic change as they been integral in keeping the United States out of international cricket when it was formed in 1909.

The United States was also able to participate in the ICC Trophy when the tournament started in 1979, where they have been successful and have continued to improve despite not yet qualifying for the World Cup. Unfortunately, the USACA proved unable to administer the sport in the United States effectively, leading to suspensions, and subsequent disqualification from tournaments.

In May 2007 the USA were to visit Darwin, Australia, to take part in Division Three of the ICC World Cricket League. A top two finish in this tournament would have qualified them for Division Two of the same tournament later in the year. Unfortunately, after the USACA was suspended from the ICC, the team was disqualified.

=== Growth of T20 cricket ===
Major League Cricket (MLC) is the highest level of domestic T20 cricket in the USA. A development league, Minor League Cricket (MiLC), started its first season in 2021, with star players from MiLC to eventually play in MLC.

== Clubs and competitions ==
=== Compton Cricket Club ===
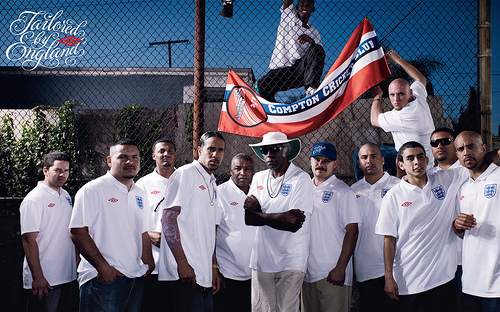

The Compton Cricket club got its start with Mustafa Khan who played cricket in England with the Los Angeles Krickets world's first homeless cricket team founded by David Sentance and Ted Hayes in September 1995. Mustafa Khan with Leo Magnus as coach introduced cricket at the Willowbrook School in Compton. Thereafter, Ted Hayes and Katie Haber raised funds to take the Compton team to England. The Compton Cricket Club, or CCC, is a cricket club based in Compton, Los Angeles County, California, USA. The CCC is an all American-born disadvantaged exhibition cricket team. The team, which includes Latino and African American ex-gang members, was founded in 1995 by US homeless activist Ted Hayes and Hollywood movie Producer Katy Haber to combat the negative effect of poverty, urban decay and crime in Compton. The club uses the ideals of sportsmanship, and the particular importance of etiquette and fair play in cricket, to help players develop respect for authority, a sense of self-esteem and self-discipline. Having toured England once as a homeless team and three times as the Compton Cricket Club, the club toured Australia in 2011 and became the first American born cricket club to tour to Australia.

=== Pro Cricket ===
Pro Cricket was operated by American Pro Cricket LLC (APC), a private company independent of the ICC and the USACA. New Jersey cricket figure Kalpesh Patel was one of the key players and acted as Commissioner while Australian Robert Smith filled the role of Assistant Commissioner and game operations specialist. The league was formed in 2004 as one of several independent efforts by different organizations to develop and promote cricket in the United States. It consisted of eight geographically distributed teams organized in two divisions that mostly used minor league baseball parks as home fields. APC originally announced that the league was fully funded for at least three years of competition, but the league struggled through its initial season due to poor attendance. Although most of the games were shown on Dish network PPV, the competition was linked to the unsuccessful launch of the so named "American Desi TV" channel based in New Jersey. The league ceased operations after the 2004 season.

==== Game-play format ====
The format of the games were 20 overs a side, similar to Twenty20 cricket. However, there were two major changes from the rules of cricket used elsewhere:

- Overs consist of five balls instead of six.
- Bowlers could bowl up to five overs each (25% of the total), meaning only four bowlers are needed rather than five.

Additionally, the league used a "designated hitter" rule, in which teams consist of 12 players, 11 of whom field and 1 of whom bat. This was similar to such rules existing in some domestic List A cricket competitions. All of these changes were designed to shorten the game and produce more aggressive batting, which the league administrators believed would help make the sport more appealing to the U.S. public.

The league counted on participation from first-class players from all the major countries, but the Indian board barred its players from participating.

Each team was allowed a limited roster of global players from professional cricket teams outside the U.S. The ICC, however, ruled that because Pro Cricket was not organised by the USACA, contracted players from ICC Test nations could not be released from their contracts to play in Pro Cricket matches. However, several notable players without contracts, such as Ajay Jadeja, Daren Ganga, Mervyn Dillon, Colin Miller and Rahul Sanghvi took part in the competition. Also featured was 51-year old Larry Gomes, as well as a few Zimbabwean exiles such as Craig Wishart. The 15–20 international players who did turn out were rotated among the teams to improve gate attractability.

Although cricket had a strong following in the U.S. up to the mid-19th century, its popularity dwindled with the rise of baseball, and it remained an almost unknown sport throughout the 20th century. The U.S. was one of the first nations to become an associate member of the ICC in 1965, but growth of the game there languished until the late 1990s, when the ICC focused development efforts on the country. Progress has since been slow but steady, and many hoped that Pro Cricket would prove to be a turning point in the popularity of the sport in the U.S.

==== 2004 season ====
The league consisted of eight teams in two divisions. The East division, known as "The Covers" and the West, known as "The Mid Wickets", are listed with their home grounds:

East Division

- New York Storm (Staten Island, New York) – Richmond County Bank Ballpark
- New Jersey Fire (Bridgewater, New Jersey) – Commerce Bank Ballpark
- D.C. Forward (Bowie, Maryland) – Prince George's Stadium
- Florida Thunder (Homestead, Florida) – Homestead Sports Complex

West Division

- Chicago Tornadoes (Schaumburg, Illinois) – Alexian Field
- San Francisco Freedom (San Francisco, Northern California) – Kezar Stadium
- Los Angeles Unity (Los Angeles, San Bernardino, Southern California) – Arrowhead Credit Union Park
- Texas Arrow Heads (Houston, Texas) – Cougar Field at the University of Houston

The competition involved round-robin home and away games between all pairings within a division, followed by inter-divisional semi-finals and a final. The schedule ran from the opening game on 19 June 2004 to the final on 4 September 2004. In addition, Pro Cricket had a policy of not playing the games that have no importance to them on the points table. The game scheduled for 21 August 2004 between Chicago and Los Angeles was canceled due to the lack of importance of the game. Neither team could have made the playoffs even if they won the game; therefore, Pro Cricket chose to not play the game. In 2004, San Francisco Freedom defeated New Jersey Fire for the league championship title.

==== Playoffs standings ====
Semifinals
1 | Florida
4 | San Francisco
3 | New Jersey
2 | Texas

Finals
San Francisco | 190/7 (12 overs)
New Jersey

== American-born Test cricketers ==
Although the United States is only an associate member of the ICC and has never played a Test match, two Test cricketers have been born in the United States. Ken Weekes was born in Boston, Massachusetts, in 1912 and played in two of the Tests on the West Indies' tour of England in 1939. Weekes scored 137 at The Oval in the last Test match before the Second World War. Weekes eventually returned to the United States from Jamaica, and died in Brooklyn in 1998.

Later, the Washington, D.C.-born Jehan Mubarak became an international Test player. He has played 13 Tests and 40 One Day Internationals for Sri Lanka.

== See also ==
- Cricket in the United States
