= Gentlemen of Ireland =

Cricket team

The Gentlemen of Ireland was an Irish cricket team which played at first-class level in the early part of the 20th century. The team composed of players who were members of the middle and upper classes, usually products of the Irish public school system. A Gentlemen of Ireland team is first recorded in 1846 playing the Royal Artillery at Barrack Field in Woolwich, England. The Gentlemen of Ireland toured North America in 1879, and repeated the tour in 1888, 1892 and 1909. During the 1909 tour, the team played two first-class matches against the Gentlemen of Philadelphia at Haverford and Germantown. The team was captained by Francis Browning for both these matches, which the Gentlemen of Ireland lost by heavy margins. The team did not appear in any recorded cricket after 1909.

== First-class matches ==
Gentlemen of Ireland
111 all out
&
74 all out
Gentlemen of Philadelphia won by an innings and 168 runs

George Morrow 50
Bart King 10/53 (18.1 overs)

William Harrington 27*
Ranji Hordern 5/30 (10.1 overs)

Merion Cricket Club Ground, Haverford
Umpires: Not known

Gentlemen of Philadelphia
353 all out

Francis White 118
George Morrow 4/42 (12.2 overs)

Gentlemen of Ireland
78 all out
&
68 all out
Gentlemen of Philadelphia won by an innings and 66 runs

George Morrow 35
Bart King 7/48 (15 overs)

George Morrow 22
Ranji Hordern 5/16 (11.2 overs)

Germantown Cricket Club Ground, Germantown
Umpires: Not known

Gentlemen of Philadelphia
212 all out

Bart King 54*
William Napper 4/72 (21 overs)
