= Charles Winter (Philadelphia cricketer) =

American cricketer

Personal information
- Full name: Charles Henry Winter
- Born: February 17, 1890; Philadelphia, Pennsylvania, U.S.
- Died: January 25, 1969 (aged 78); Wilmington, Delaware, U.S.
- Batting: Right-handed
- Role: Wicket-keeper

Domestic team information
- Years: Team
- 1908–1913: Gentlemen of Philadelphia
- 1905–1925: Frankford
- FC debut: July 20, 1908 Gentlemen of Philadelphia v Middlesex
- Last FC: June 28, 1913 Gentlemen of Philadelphia v Australians
- Halifax Cup debut: August 5, 1905 Frankford v Philadelphia
- Last Halifax Cup: June 27, 1925 Frankford v Germantown

Career statistics
Competition	First-class
Matches	13
Runs scored	70
Batting average	5.83
100s/50s	0/0
Top score	18*
Catches/stumpings	13/16
- Source: CricketArchive, May 11, 2010

Charles Henry Winter (February 17, 1890 – January 25, 1969) was an American cricketer who played 13 first-class matches for the Gentlemen of Philadelphia between 1908 and 1913, and Halifax Cup matches for Frankford Cricket Club.

== Cricket career ==
Winter made his Halifax Cup debut in 1905, aged 15 for Frankford Cricket Club against Philadelphia Cricket Club. Playing as wicket-keeper, he took two catches in the first-innings of the match. After making two appearances in 1905, he played nine of Frankford's ten Halifax Cup matches in 1906, and was rewarded with a position in the 'All Philadelphia' team to face 'All New York' at the end of the season. He made four stumpings in the match, which finished a draw. He attended the University of Philadelphia, and was a member of the cricket team, touring England in 1907. He returned to England in 1908 as part of the touring Gentlemen of Philadelphia side. He made his first-class debut on this tour against Middlesex. He scored 0 not out and 2, and took a stumping and a catch during the game. He took three stumpings in an innings on three occasions during the tour, against Ireland, Ulster and Durham. On the tour's return, Winter played for his country against Canada. During the following winter of 1908–09, Winter toured with the Gentlemen of Philadelphia once again, travelling to Jamaica to contest six matches.

He played only three of Frankford's eight fixtures in the 1909 Halifax Cup, before representing the Gentlemen against a touring Gentlemen of Ireland side. Winter's first-innings score of 18 not out was his highest first-class total. In 1912 he represented the United States against Canada again, and then over the next year played three matches for the Gentlemen of Philadelphia against the Australians. During the 1913 Halifax Cup, Winter made his first half-century in the competition, scoring 56 against Merion. He scored his second against the same opposition in the following season, improving on his previous total to score 60. Winter was again part of a touring side in England in 1921, travelling with the Philadelphian Pilgrims for twelve matches against various, primarily military, sides. Winter's third half-century, an unbeaten 53 in 1923, was also his third against Merion, once again being scored at Merion's ground. The following season, Winter scored his first half-century against other opposition, making 57 against Philadelphia.
