= Tioga Cricket Club =

Cricket club in United States

The Tioga Cricket Club was a cricket club in Philadelphia, Pennsylvania, United States. The club played their home matches at the self-titled "Tioga Cricket Club Ground", based on Westmoreland Street in Tioga, Philadelphia. Their first recorded match was in 1887, and in 1890, they joined the Halifax Cup, a formal tournament between a number of cricket clubs in the Philadelphia region. The club was the initial home of Bart King, who was described in his Wisden Cricketers' Almanack obituary as "beyond question the greatest all-round cricketer produced by America." Along with the other teams in the area, Tioga contributed players to the Philadelphian cricket team, who played a number of first-class cricket matches against English opposition. The club disbanded following the 1896 season.

== See also ==
- Philadelphia Cricket Club
- Merion Cricket Club
- Germantown Cricket Club
- Belmont Cricket Club

== Bibliography ==
Melville, Tom (1998). The Tented Field: A History of Cricket in America. Bowling Green State University Popular Press. ISBN 0-87972-769-1.
