= Franklin Altemus =

American cricketer

Personal information
- Full name: Franklin Lee Altemus
- Born: 8 November 1867; Philadelphia, Pennsylvania, United States
- Died: December 1934 (aged 67); Washington, D.C., United States
- Batting: Right-handed
- Bowling: Right-arm roundarm (unknown style)

Domestic team information
- Years: Team
- 1894–1895: Gentlemen of Philadelphia

Career statistics
Competition	First-class
Matches	3
Runs scored	2
Batting average	0.66
100s/50s	–/–
Top score	2
Balls bowled	306
Wickets	4
Bowling average	39.00
5 wickets in innings	–
10 wickets in match	–
Best bowling	4/132
Catches/stumpings	2/–
- Source: Cricinfo, 6 November 2022

Franklin Lee Altemus (8 November 1867 – December 1934) was an American first-class cricketer.

Altemus was born at Philadelphia in November 1867. He studied at the University of Pennsylvania, but did not graduate, leaving during his first year. Playing his club cricket for Belmont and Philadelphia, he made three appearances in first-class cricket. Two of these came for the Gentlemen of Philadelphia, against the Players of United States of America in 1894 and F. Mitchell's XI in 1895; his other first-class appearance came for A. M. Wood's XI against G. S. Patterson's XI. He took four wickets in first-class cricket, all of which came in a single innings with figures of 4 for 132. Outside of cricket, Altemus was employed firstly as a clerk at the United States Hydrographic Office from 1884 to 1886, before moving to the Commonwealth Title and Trust Company from 1887 to 1889. He spent the next year working for the Planning Office of Philadelphia, before joining the National Bank of Commerce (Philadelphia). Altemus was a bachelor by 1922 and professed baseball as his 'outdoor pleasure'. Altemus died at Washington, D.C. in December 1934.
