= William Napper (Irish cricketer) =

Irish cricketer and British Army officer

Personal information
- Full name: William Henry Napper
- Born: 5 November 1880; County Wexford, Ireland
- Died: August 1967 (aged 86); Ganges Harbour, British Columbia, Canada
- Batting: Right-handed
- Bowling: Slow left-arm orthodox

Domestic team information
- Years: Team
- 1908–1909: Ireland

Career statistics
Competition	First-class
Matches	5
Runs scored	18
Batting average	2.00
100s/50s	–/–
Top score	10
Balls bowled	306
Wickets	7
Bowling average	31.85
5 wickets in innings	–
10 wickets in match	–
Best bowling	4/72
Catches/stumpings	2/–
- Source: Cricinfo, 26 October 2018

William Henry Napper MC (5 November 1880 – August 1967) was an Irish first-class cricketer and British Army officer.

Born at County Wexford, Napper received his education in England at Shrewsbury School, before returning to Ireland in 1903 to study at Trinity College Dublin. While studying there, he played club cricket for Dublin University Cricket Club. Napper made his debut in first-class cricket for Ireland against the touring Gentlemen of Philadelphia at Dublin in 1908. He played a further first-class match for Ireland in 1908 against Yorkshire at Dublin, and made one appearance in 1909 against Scotland at Perth. Napper toured North America with the Gentlemen of Ireland on their 1909 tour, playing minor matches against Ottawa, Ontario, All New York, Baltimore, and Philadelphia Colts. He played two first-class matches for the Gentlemen of Ireland against the Gentlemen of Philadelphia at Haverford and Philadelphia. He took seven wickets across his five first-class matches with his slow left-arm orthodox, at a bowling average of 31.85 and best innings figures of 4/72.

Napper did not return from the tour, instead settling in Canada. He returned to the United Kingdom to fight in World War I. He enlisted with the Royal Army Service Corps in October 1914, with the rank of Second Lieutenant. He was promoted to the rank of Temporary Captain in December 1914. By December 1916, he held the rank of Temporary Major. He was awarded the Military Cross for bravery during the war. Napper relinquished his commission in May 1920, presumably returning to Canada. During peacetime he worked as an engineer. He died at Ganges Harbour in British Columbia in August 1967.
