= Major League Cricket (2000) =

U.S. cricket organization

- Sport: Cricket
- Founded: 2000
- Folded: circa 2008
- CEO: Bernard Cameron
- Country: United States
- Headquarters: Brooklyn, New York

Major League Cricket (MLC) was an American company based in Brooklyn dedicated to running a professional cricket competition within the United States, as well as developing and promoting the sport to raise its profile in North America. MLC was not recognized by the United States of America Cricket Association (USACA), and thus had no official status within the recognized international structure of cricket. It is unrelated to the like-named organization that began play in July 2023.

== History ==
MLC formed in New Jersey in 2000, with the explicit goals of developing grassroots support for young cricketers in the U.S. and leading up to professional competitiveness at the international level. During its early years, MLC was stifled from achieving much within the organization of cricket by the United States of America Cricket Association (USACA). However, with the increasing disruption to U.S. cricket administration caused by political turmoil within USACA, the overall structure of U.S. cricket began to break down, allowing MLC to step into the fray and begin organizing its own events.

With the collapse of the ambitious Pro Cricket league following its maiden, and only, season in 2004, MLC became a major player in the complex political situation in which American cricket found itself. In February 2006, MLC approached the International Cricket Council (ICC) with a formal request to recognize it as the official governing body of cricket in the U.S., in preference to USACA. The request was eventually turned down by the ICC.

The domain name for MLC's website—www.mlcus.com—expired in April 2008 and was not renewed.

In 2017, the USACA was expelled by the ICC due to governance issues. It was replaced by USA Cricket in 2019.

== Events ==
=== Under-15 Tournament ===
On June 7, 2005, MLC announced an under-15 tournament in Chicago, to be played that August, as part of its program of youth cricket development. Italian sporting goods manufacturer L-SPORTO sponsored the competition. However, in July the tournament was first moved to New Jersey, and then cancelled, with MLC citing "logistical problems" as the reason. The USA Cricket Academy headed by Ashok Patel, and Major League Cricket, both based in New Jersey also formed an alliance to develop a New jersey under 13 tournament.

=== Sir Clive Lloyd Cup ===
MLC announced a new National Interstate Cricket Cup tournament, to be held in November 2005 in Broward County, Florida, under the patronage of former West Indies captain and International Cricket Council match referee Sir Clive Lloyd. Due to Hurricane Wilma, it was postponed to the end of November, eventually being played between 30 November and 4 December.

Teams representing the states of Florida, North Carolina, Pennsylvania, Texas, Virginia and Washington played in the inaugural tournament. The tournament included two divisions, one for senior players, and one for players under the age of 25. Former West Indian opening batsman Desmond Haynes will be involved with coaching national U.S. youth and senior teams selected during the tournament.

=== United States Cricket Development Program ===
In July 2005, MLC announced an ambitious 10-year program for the development of domestic competition and international level cricket skills within the U.S. The program developed by Bernard Cameron and expanded by former 1st class players Robert Smith and Desmond Haynes, includes plans to establish National Cricket Centres to encourage local development, a National Cricket Academy, and certification of cricket coaches and umpires. MLC has stated the goal of preparing a U.S. team capable of qualifying for the 2011 Cricket World Cup.

Another part of the development program was the establishment of world class cricket playing facilities in the U.S. To this end, MLC met with The Walt Disney Company and convinced them to pledge over 30 acres (12 ha) of land in Florida for the construction of a custom multi-function cricket and soccer stadium.

=== Professional Twenty20 league ===
In September 2005, MLC announced plans to launch a professional eight team Twenty20 league in the U.S., with a first season to have been played in 2007. Players for the tournament were to have been recruited from the state-based teams represented in the Sir Clive Lloyd Cup.
