= Halifax Cup =

The Halifax Cup was a cricket tournament held in Philadelphia, Pennsylvania between 1880 and 1926. A variety of clubs from the Philadelphia region were involved in the competition, including most principally the Philadelphia Cricket Club, Belmont Cricket Club, Germantown Cricket Club and Merion Cricket Club.

After 1885, only amateurs could play for the Cup.

== Winners ==
Club	Season
Young America Cricket Club	1880
Young America Cricket Club	1881
Belmont Cricket Club	1882
Young America Cricket Club	1883
Belmont Cricket Club	1884
Young America Cricket Club	1885
Germantown Cricket Club	1886
Belmont Cricket Club	1887
Merion Cricket Club	1888
Germantown Cricket Club	1889
Belmont Cricket Club/Germantown Cricket Club	1890
Germantown Cricket Club	1891
Germantown Cricket Club	1892
Germantown Cricket Club	1893
Belmont Cricket Club	1894
Germantown Cricket Club	1895
Belmont Cricket Club/Germantown Cricket Club	1896
