= Charles Winter =

Charles Winter may refer to:

- Charles E. Winter (1870–1948), U.S. Representative from Wyoming
- Charles Winter (cricketer, born 1866) (1866–1954), English cricketer who represented Somerset in 25 first-class matches between 1882 and 1895
- Charles Winter (Philadelphia cricketer) (1890–1969), American cricketer who represented the Gentlemen of Philadelphia in 13 first-class matches between 1908 and 1913
- Charles Winter (cricketer, born 1903) (1903–1982), English cricketer who represented Somerset in 26 first-class matches between 1921 and 1925

== See also ==
- Charles Winters (disambiguation)
