= William Harrington (Irish cricketer) =

Cricket information
- Batting: Right-handed
- Bowling: Right-arm off spin

International information
- National side: Ireland

Career statistics
Competition	First-class
Matches	15
Runs scored	153
Batting average	7.65
100s/50s	0/0
Top score	28
Balls bowled	2,770
Wickets	53
Bowling average	19.22
5 wickets in innings	4
10 wickets in match	1
Best bowling	7/76
Catches/stumpings	3/–
- Source: CricketArchive, 15 November 2022

William Harrington (27 December 1869 – 2 January 1940) was an Irish cricketer. A right-handed batsman and off spin bowler, he played 28 times for the Ireland cricket team between 1894 and 1921, including fifteen first-class matches.

== Playing career ==
Harrington made his debut for Ireland against I Zingari in July 1894, and soon became a regular member of the team. He played seven further times for Ireland until 1901, playing against I Zingari, the MCC, Surrey and South Africa, amongst others.

In 1902, he made his first-class debut for Ireland, playing against London County in May. He played three further first-class matches that month, against the MCC, Oxford University and Cambridge University. He took 11 wickets in the match against Cambridge University, the only time he took more than ten wickets in a match for Ireland. His figures of 7/76 in the first innings were his best innings bowling figures for Ireland.

His career continued over the next ten years, playing against Scotland, South Africa, Cambridge University and Yorkshire, amongst others. He went with the Gentlemen of Ireland on a tour to the US in 1909. The tour started well for the Gentlemen of Ireland with a five wicket win against New York on Staten Island but disaster struck in the next match against Philadelphia as Bart King ripped through the Irish batting line up, taking all ten wickets in the first innings and a hat-trick in the second as the Gentlemen of Ireland lost by an innings and 168 runs. Harrington stood tall in the second innings with 27 not out, the highest score of that innings for the Irish. Ireland also lost the last match of the tour, also against Philadelphia by an innings.

After the American tour, he played three first-class matches against Scotland in 1910, 1911 and 1912. He then came back to the Irish side nine years later for a final match against Scotland in August 1921 at the age of 51.

== Statistics ==
In all matches for Ireland, he scored 270 runs at an average of 8.44 with a high score of 30 against Cambridge University in 1904. He took 112 wickets at an average of 16.62. He took five wickets in an innings eight times and ten wickets in a match once.
