= Henry Sayen =

American cricketer

Personal information
- Full name: William Henry Sayen
- Born: 22 January 1883; St. Davids, Pennsylvania, United States
- Died: 29 January 1965 (aged 82); Princeton, New Jersey, United States
- Batting: Right-handed
- Bowling: Right-arm fast

Career statistics
Competition	First-class
Matches	7
Runs scored	136
Batting average	12.36
100s/50s	0/0
Top score	29
Balls bowled	603
Wickets	12
Bowling average	33.83
5 wickets in innings	0
10 wickets in match	0
Best bowling	4/33
Catches/stumpings	8/–
- Source: Cricinfo, 6 August 2019

William Henry Sayen (22 January 1883 – 29 January 1965) was an American first-class cricketer.

The son of the railway builder William Henry Sayen, he was born at St. Davids, Pennsylvania, in January 1883. He was educated at Haverford School, before going up to Princeton University. Sayen was interested in cricket at a young age, an interest which he carried into his adult life. A member of the Merion Cricket Club, his fast bowling gained notoriety when he was the first American selected to represent the Gentlemen of England, making his debut in first-class cricket for the team against Cambridge University at Eastbourne in June 1908. He joined the touring Philadelphian cricket team the following month, making six first-class appearances against English county opponents. For the Philadelphians, he scored 113 runs on the tour, at an average of 10.27 and a high score of 29. With the ball, he took 9 wickets at a bowling average of 28.77, with best figures of 4 for 44. His bowling was described as the sensation of the English sporting world. While in England, Sayen met Edith May Conyers, the sister of the Bermudian politician Reginald Conyers, with the couple marrying in 1910.

Following the tour, he played no further first-class cricket. He settled in Princeton, becoming the president and treasurer of the Mercer Rubber Co. He served during the First World War, though not with the United States Army, instead serving with the 9th Army Corps and the 34th Corps of the French Army. For his service in the war, Sayen was decorated with the French commemorative medal and the Croix de Guerre, including a citation from General Pétain. Following the war, he became active in local affairs in Princeton, serving on the Princeton Borough Council. In his role he was instrumental in the paving of Nassau Street. He was also the founder and first president of the Princeton Chamber of Commerce. He retired from the Mercer Rubber Co. in 1956 and in his retirement he wrote A Yankee Looks at Cricket, a book on the history of cricket in America. Following the death of his first wife, with whom he had two children, he married Emily C. Lyman around 1956. He died at Princeton following a three year long illness in January 1965, one week after his 82nd birthday.
