= Andrew Aikman =

Scottish cricketer

Personal information
- Full name: Andrew Miller Aikman
- Born: 9 April 1885; Galashiels, Selkirkshire, Scotland
- Died: 14 April 1959 (aged 74); Galashiels, Selkirkshire, Scotland
- Batting: Right-handed
- Role: Wicket-keeper

Domestic team information
- Years: Team
- 1921: Scotland

Career statistics
Competition	First-class
Matches	1
Runs scored	1
Batting average	1.00
100s/50s	–/–
Top score	1
Catches/stumpings	–/–
- Source: Cricinfo, 23 June 2022

Andrew Miller Aikman (9 April 1885 — 14 April 1959) was a Scottish first-class cricketer.

Aikman was born at Galashiels in April 1885. During the First World War he served as a seaman in the Royal Navy. Following the war, Aikman played one first-class cricket match as a wicket-keeper for Scotland against Ireland at Dublin in 1921. Batting once in the match, he was dismissed for a single run in the Scotland first innings by William Harrington. In club cricket he played for Gala Cricket Club, and by profession he was a commercial traveller in textiles. Aikman died at Galashiels in April 1959.
