= Philadelphian cricket team in England in 1897 =

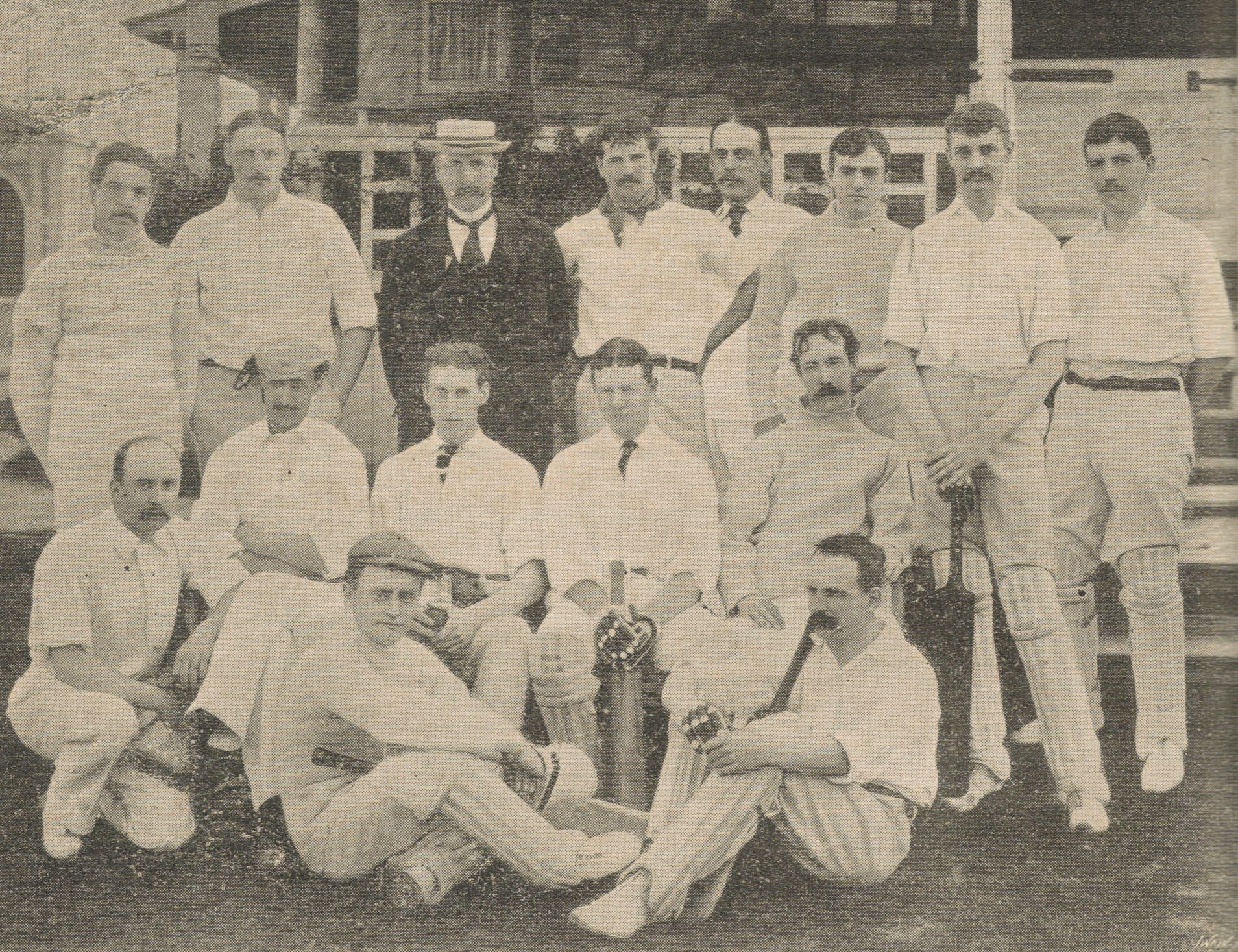
A team portrait of the Philadelphian side on the 1897 tour

The Philadelphian cricket team toured England in the summer of 1897. Starting on 7 June at Oxford, the tour lasted for two months and ended in late July at The Oval. The Americans played 15 first-class matches captained by George Stuart Patterson.

The match the Philadelphians played against the MCC was to be Patterson's last first-class cricket match. The tour introduced American bowler J Barton King to the international cricketing world.

== Tour results ==
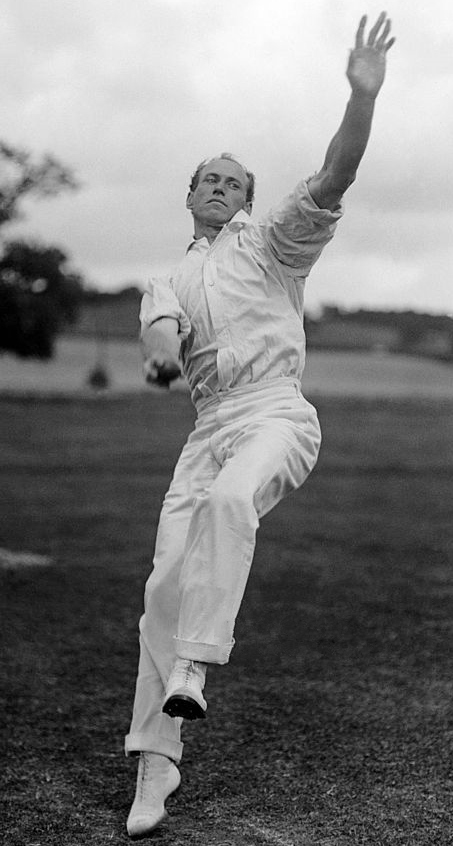
John Barton King, widely considered to be the best bowler produced by the United States, was a sensation on the 1897 tour.

This tour was a very ambitious one for the Americans. They had last toured the British Isles in 1889. Though the results may have been less satisfactory than hoped for by promoters, the tour was arranged mainly for educational purposes and few of those on the American side expected to win many matches. Previous tours had tended to involve amateur English sides with a relatively low level of competition. In 1897 a schedule was made including all of the top county cricket teams, the Oxford and Cambridge University teams, the Marylebone Cricket Club, and two other sides, though only a few of the counties thought it worthwhile to put their best elevens onto the field. While it initially aroused some curiosity, many English fans lost interest until Bart King and the Philadelphians met the full Sussex team at Brighton on 17 June. In the first innings, King proved his batting worth on a fourth-wicket stand of 107 runs with John Lester. He then took 7 wickets for 13 runs and the team dismissed Sussex for 46 in less than an hour. In the second innings, King took 6 for 102 and helped the Philadelphians to a victory by 8 wickets.

Despite the excitement surrounding King's performance, the Americans did not fare well overall. Fifteen matches were played, but only two were won while the team lost nine and earned a draw on four. The other win of the tour came against Warwickshire. During this match King again shined by taking 5 for 95 and 7 for 72 and scoring 46 runs. According to the Wisden Cricketers' Almanack King proved himself to be the best bowler on the American side and had to do much of the work. He bowled three hundred overs more than anyone else. His average was just over 24 runs each for 72 wickets. In addition to his work bowling, King scored 441 runs with an average of just over 20. Captain George Patterson's best innings batting was 162 runs at Trent Bridge against Nottinghamshire.

== Controversy ==
Having returned home from the tour, there were claims in the Philadelphia Public Ledger that the Philadelphians had been treated unfairly by the English umpires, but Patterson put those rumors to rest with a letter to the editor of an American newspaper:

My attention has been directed to a letter signed W.S. in the Field of July 24th, enclosing a clipping from the Philadelphia Public Ledger, severely criticising the umpiring in the Philadelphian matches during our tour through England. I wish to state on behalf of the Philadelphia team that the sentiments expressed in the clipping are not those of the team, and that we emphatically repudiate any insinuation of unfair treatment. On the contrary, we have been received with the most unvarying courtesy and fairness both on and off the field. I wish to take this opportunity of making a public acknowledgement of our indebtedness to Mr. Perkins, of the M.C.C., for the umpires assigned to us, and to testify, unnecessary though it be, to their ability and integrity.

The calming words from Patterson on the issue seem to have defused the situation in Philadelphia.

== See also ==
- United States cricket team
