= Young America Cricket Club =

The Young America Cricket Club (YACC) was founded on 19 November 1855 at the house of William Wister after the Germantown Cricket Club team refused to allow young players to gain cricket experience through match participation.

== History ==
The Newhall family joined with the Wister family founding the club in 1855 with the first games played on the Wisters' Belfield estate. The YACC team was largely responsible for keeping cricket going in Philadelphia during the Civil War. The YACC played at the Turnpike Bridge ground from 1858 to 1877 before moving to their new Stenton ground in 1879. The Germantown Cricket Club allowed YACC to share their Nicetown ground while their new ground was being prepared.

Walter and Charles Newhall became famous YACC players. Walter Newhall scored his first century aged 12. Charles was the most successful bowler against the 1872 England team earning the respect W. G. Grace, England's greatest batsman. Before Bob Newhall captained Philadelphia's first touring team in England the YACC played the Toronto Cricket Club in Canada. Three generations (ten members) of the Newhall family played on the YACC from its founding in 1854 to its merging with the Germantown CC in 1890. The Newhalls also helped administer cricket in Philadelphia. George Newhall became editor of the American Cricketer which had a 52-year publication history from 1877 to 1929.

YACC won the Halifax Cup in 1880, 1883 and 1885. The Halifax Cup won by a Philadelphia team in 1874 at Halifax in Nova Scotia became the social event of the year in Philadelphia from 1880 to 1926 by which time it was eclipsed by golf and tennis tournaments.

== See also ==
- Philadelphian cricket team
- Merion Cricket Club
- Belmont Cricket Club
