= Robert Smith (Otago cricketer) =

Australian-born former cricketer (born 1974)

Personal information
- Full name: Robert Gary Thomas Smith
- Born: 24 October 1974 (age 52); Sutherland, Sydney, New South Wales, Australia
- Batting: Right-handed
- Bowling: Right-arm leg-spin
- Role: Bowler

Domestic team information
- Years: Team
- 2001/02: Otago
- 2008/09: North Otago

Career statistics
Competition	First-class	List A
Matches	6	2
Runs scored	102	7
Batting average	11.33	7.0
100s/50s	0/0	0/0
Top score	21	7
Balls bowled	1118	54
Wickets	12	2
Bowling average	49.83	33.00
5 wickets in innings	0	0
10 wickets in match	0	0
Best bowling	3/21	2/29
Catches/stumpings	1/–	3/–
- Source: CricInfo, 24 May 2016

Robert Gary Thomas Smith (born 24 October 1974) is an Australian-born former cricketer who played in New Zealand. He played six first-class and two List A matches for Otago during the 2001–02 season.

Smith was born at Sutherland in Sydney in 1974. He played Sydney Grade Cricket for Sutherland District Cricket Club, taking 257 first grade wickets over 10 seasons, and played age-group and Second XI cricket for New South Wales between 1993–94 and 1997–98 and for the Queensland Academy of Sport in 1999–2000. He was a member of the New South Wales and Queensland Sheffield Shield squads and played Second XI cricket in the United Kingdom for Glamorgan County Cricket Club.

A qualified teacher, Smith moved to New Zealand to complete a master's degree in sports marketing and management. He made his first-class debut for Otago in November 2001 against Northern Districts, scoring 20 runs and not taking a wicket on debut. Primarily a leg-spin bowler, he took 12 first-class and two List A wickets for Otago during the season.

Smith played Hawke Cup cricket for North Otago during the 2008–09 season. He was later heavily involved in the development of cricket in the USA though his involvement with the US Women's National Team, Major League Cricket and ProCricket. Smith returned to Australia where he has been involved in Queensland Women's Premier cricket.
