= Charles Winters (disambiguation) =

Charles Winters was an American businessman.

Charles Winters may also refer to:

- Chuck Winters (born 1974), former Canadian Football League linebacker and defensive back

== See also ==
- Charles Winter (disambiguation)
