= St. Davids, Pennsylvania =

Unincorporated community in Pennsylvania, US

- Populated place
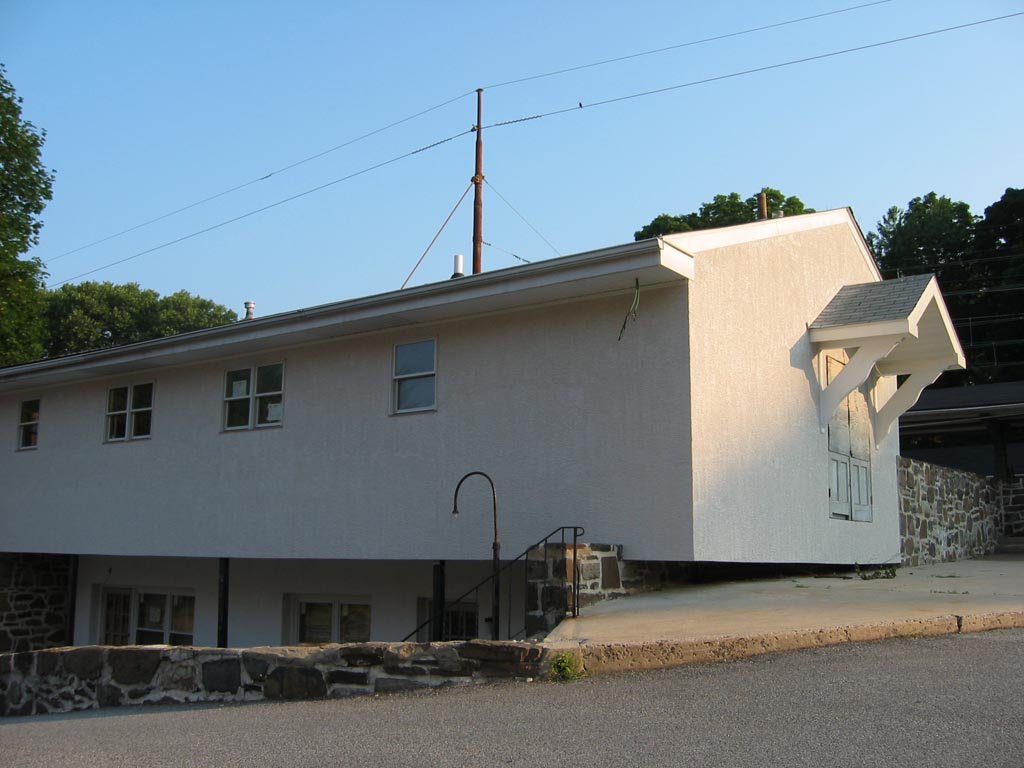
- St. Davids train station

- Location of St. Davids in Pennsylvania
- Coordinates: 40°02′27″N 75°22′43″W
- Country: United States
- State: Pennsylvania
- County: Delaware
- Township: Radnor
- Elevation: 351 ft (107 m)
- Time zone: UTC-5 (EST)
  - Summer (DST): UTC-4 (EDT)
- ZIP code: 19087
- Area codes: 610 and 484

St. Davids is a primarily residential neighborhood located in the eastern part of Wayne in Delaware County, Pennsylvania, United States. It is served by its own train station. St. Davids is home to the main campus of Eastern University, a four-year, liberal arts university affiliated with the American Baptist Churches USA.

The community, on the Philadelphia Main Line, was named for St. Davids Church, an 18th-century church in the area that was in turn named for St. David, the patron saint of Wales (the country of origin of many of the area's first European settlers). The community's name is correctly spelled without an apostrophe.

Located near Interstate 476 (the "Blue Route") and Lancaster Avenue, St. Davids is approximately 15 miles from Philadelphia and has recently experienced a large growth spurt; however, it is still a quiet residential community which shares a ZIP code (19087) with the adjacent community of Wayne.

== Notable people ==
- Henry Sayen (1883–1965), cricketer
- Richard Helms (1913–2002), former Director of Central Intelligence
