= American Cricketer =

Magazine (1877–1929)

Cover of the May 1916 issue of The American Cricketer.

The American Cricketer was the publication of record for the club and cricket in the United States for more than half a century. The slim magazine was first published in Philadelphia in 1877 and continued to be printed until 1929, a total of 52 years. It was published weekly during the summer cricketing season and monthly in winter. George Newhall, of the Newhall cricketing family of Philadelphia, was one of its editors.

== See also ==
- Young America Cricket Club
