= George Morrow (cricketer) =

Irish badminton player and cricketer (1877–1914)

Cricket information
- Batting: Right-handed

International information
- National side: Ireland

Career statistics
Competition	First-class
Matches	8
Runs scored	271
Batting average	20.84
100s/50s	0/1
Top score	50*
Balls bowled	122
Wickets	5
Bowling average	14.00
5 wickets in innings	0
10 wickets in match	0
Best bowling	4/42
Catches/stumpings	4/–
- Source: CricketArchive, 6 December 2022

George Alexander Morrow (11 August 1877 – 15 November 1914) was an Irish cricketer and badminton player.

He made his debut for Ireland against South Africa in August 1907, and went on to play for them on eight occasions, his last game coming in July 1912, also against South Africa. All but one of his games for Ireland had first-class status. He also represented Ireland at badminton.
