= Bart King =

American cricketer (1873–1965)

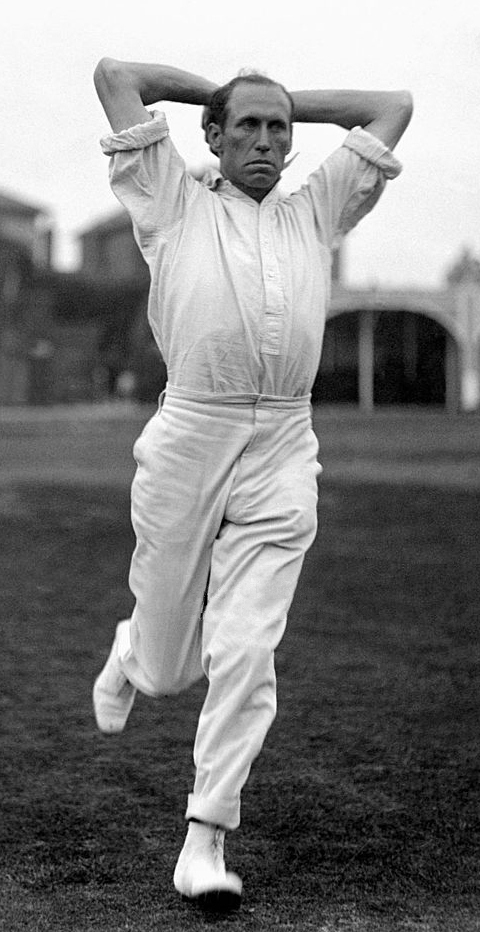
- King c. 1905

Personal information
- Full name: John Barton King
- Born: October 19, 1873; Philadelphia, Pennsylvania, U.S.
- Died: October 17, 1965 (aged 91); Philadelphia, Pennsylvania, U.S.
- Batting: Right-handed
- Bowling: Right-arm fast
- Role: Bowler

Domestic team information
- Years: Team
- 1893–1912: Gentlemen of Philadelphia
- 1894: G.S. Patterson XI
- FC debut: September 29, 1893 Gentlemen of Philadelphia v Australians
- Last FC: October 4, 1912 Gentlemen of Philadelphia v Australians

Career statistics
Competition	First-class
Matches	65
Runs scored	2,134
Batting average	20.51
100s/50s	1/8
Top score	113*
Balls bowled	13729
Wickets	415
Bowling average	15.65
5 wickets in innings	38
10 wickets in match	11
Best bowling	10/53
Catches/stumpings	67/–
- Source: CricketArchive, August 18, 2007

John Barton "Bart" King (October 19, 1873 – October 17, 1965) was an American cricketer, active in the late 19th and early 20th centuries. King was part of the Philadelphia team that played from the end of the 19th century until the outbreak of World War I. This period of cricket in the United States was dominated by "gentlemen cricketers"—men of independent wealth who did not need to work. King, an amateur from a middle-class family, was able to devote time to cricket thanks to a job set up by his teammates.

A skilled batsman who proved his worth as a bowler, King set numerous records in the continent of North America during his career and led the first-class bowling averages in England in 1908. He successfully competed against the best cricketers from England and Australia. King was the dominant bowler on his team when it toured England in 1897, 1903, and 1908. He dismissed batsmen with his unique delivery, which he called the "angler", and helped develop the art of swing bowling in the sport. Sir Pelham Warner described Bart King as "one of the finest bowlers of all time", and Donald Bradman called him "America's greatest cricketing son."

== Early and personal life ==
King was born in Philadelphia on October 19, 1873. Early in his life, he worked in a linen trade. Although this was the family business, his father later allowed him to leave to enter the insurance industry. King was not a member of the aristocratic and wealthy families of Philadelphia that produced many of the era's top cricketers. King's obituary in Cricket Quarterly suggests that his career in insurance was set up for him by those families to allow him to continue playing the game. In 1913 (or 1911), King married Fannie Lockhart; the marriage lasted for fifty years. King's wife died in 1963, and he died in 1965 in his native Philadelphia two days before his 92nd birthday.

Bart King was regarded by many of his contemporaries as an affable person. Ralph Barker called him the Bob Hope of cricket thanks to his quips and stories. King was also noted for making jabs at opponents, but leaving them laughing at themselves. The same held true when he would question umpires that turned down his appeals. He is said to have spoken for ninety minutes at a dinner during his last tour to England, punctuated every few seconds with laughs. The dinner guests were kept laughing even while King spoke with a dead-pan expression. One man who attended the dinner noted that King "told his impossible tales with such an air of conviction ... that his audiences were always in doubt when to take him seriously. He made their task doubly difficult by sprinkling in a fair mixture of truth with his fiction."

Arthur Mailey described him as a "tall, beautifully built, American Adonis."

== Cricketing career ==
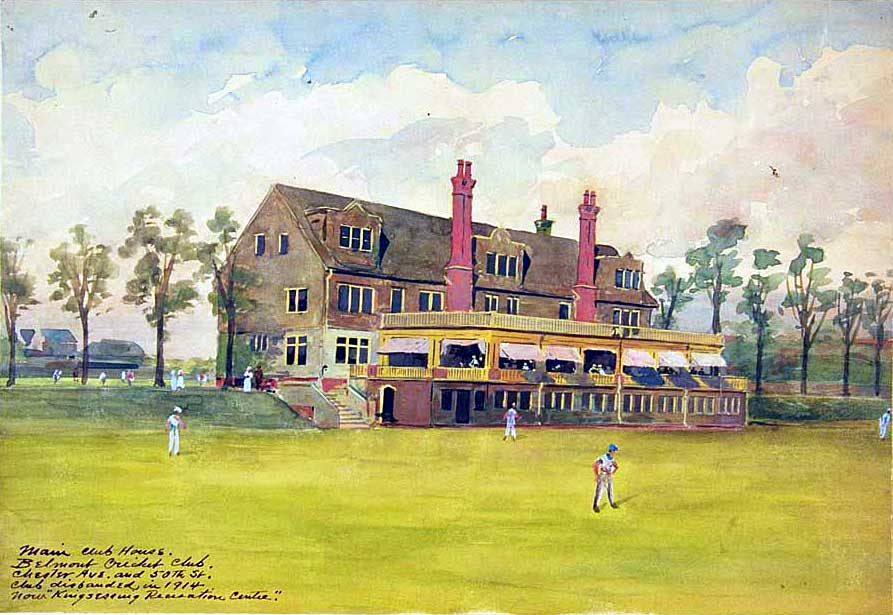
King played most of his Philadelphia club career at the Belmont Cricket Club.

Like most young American men of this era, Bart King came to cricket only after first playing baseball. He began to play club cricket at Tioga Cricket Club in 1888, aged 15, starting out as a batsman. Tioga was one of the lesser Philadelphian cricket clubs. King played his first recorded match for the club in 1889, when he was tried as a bowler due to his physique. He took 37 wickets for 99 runs for the club in the 1889 cricket season.

King played for Tioga until 1896, when he joined Belmont Cricket Club. King joined the Philadelphian cricket team for three tours of England while playing at Belmont. King's most dominating matches came during these tours, playing with the premier American team of the era.

=== Australia in Philadelphia ===
In 1893, the Australian team stopped by Philadelphia on its way home from a tour of England. Australia fielded a strong side, but the team was tired after a long tour and trip. In spite of this fatigue, the Australians chose to face the full strength of the Gentlemen of Philadelphia in a three-day match starting September 29.

On a small ground at Belmont, the September grass was coarse. It had been rolled so that the ball moved very quickly across the ground. The Australian side, fielding first, dropped many catches and could not cope with the short boundary, allowing the Philadelphians to reach a huge total of 525 runs. King came in to bat last, at number 11, making 36 runs. The leading Australian bowlers, Hugh Trumble and George Giffen, took 2 for 104 and 0 for 114 respectively. When the Australians came to bat, they hoped that they would, by now, have recovered from their tiring journey, but ran into problems when dealing with Bart King's developing swing bowling. The side was all out for 199, with King taking 5 wickets for 78 runs. The Australians followed on and were all out again for 268, allowing the Gentlemen of Philadelphia to win by an innings and 68 runs.

The cricket world was stunned that a single American city could turn out a side capable of beating the full strength of Australia. The Australians won the return match on October 6 by six wickets, but the Australian captain, Jack Blackham, said to the Americans, "You have better players here than we have been led to believe. They class with England's best."

=== Tour of England in 1897 ===
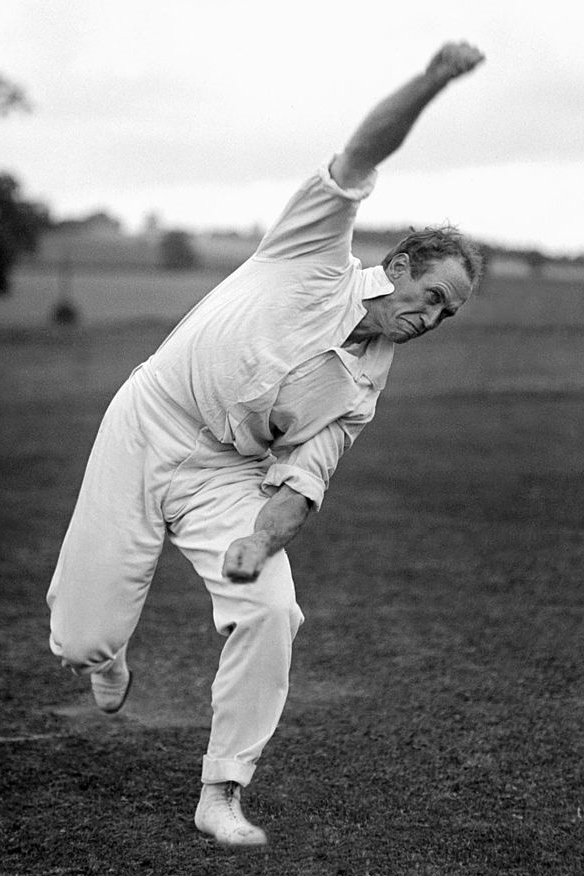
Bart King c. 1905

King won the Child's Bowling Cup, the premier award for bowling in American cricket, for the first time in 1896, and joined the Philadelphian cricket team's tour of England in 1897. The tour was very ambitious, and was arranged mainly for educational purposes: few of those on the American side expected to win many matches. Previous tours had tended to involve amateur English sides with a low level of competition. In 1897, the tour started on June 7 at Oxford, ending in late July at The Oval almost 2 months later. The schedule included fifteen matches against all of the top county cricket teams, the Oxford and Cambridge University teams, the Marylebone Cricket Club, and two other sides, though only a few of the counties thought it worthwhile to put their best elevens onto the field.

While the tour initially aroused some curiosity, many English fans lost interest until Bart King and the Philadelphians met the full Sussex team at Brighton on June 17. King demonstrated his batting ability in the first innings with a fourth-wicket stand of 107 with John Lester. He then took 7 wickets for 13 runs, and Philadelphia dismissed Sussex for 46 in less than an hour. King took 6 for 102 in Sussex's second innings, helping the Philadelphians to victory by 8 wickets.

Despite the excitement surrounding King's performance, the Americans did not fare well overall, and the results may have been worse than hoped for by the tour's promoters. Philadelphia won only two of their fifteen matches, losing nine and earning a draw in the remaining four. After their win against Sussex, the only other win of the tour came against Warwickshire. During this match, King took 5 for 95 and 7 for 72 and scored 46 runs. According to Wisden Cricketers' Almanack, King proved himself to be the best bowler on the American side and had to do much of the work. He bowled three hundred overs, more than anyone else in the team, taking 72 wickets with a bowling average of a little over 24 runs. In addition to his bowling, King scored 441 runs as a batsman at a batting average of just over 20.

Following the 1897 tour, many English counties were interested in securing King's services. It was thought that he would not play as a professional, so alternative means of remuneration had to be found: one county reportedly offered to arrange a marriage with a widow who had an income of £7000 per year. In the end, King returned to the United States, where he continued to perform very well in club cricket.

=== Tour of England in 1903 ===
The Philadelphian team returned to England in 1903. This proved to be King's most successful tour, particularly his performances in the matches against Lancashire and Surrey. King played in 13 of the 15 matches on the tour, missing two with a strained side. In his first match, against Cambridge University, he took 5 for 136 and 4 for 28. He followed that with 8 for 39 in the first innings against Oxford University, though the match was eventually abandoned as a draw due to rain. In his next match, against Gloucestershire, he took 2 for 26 in the first innings but did not bowl in the second. He also took 7 for 51 and 2 for 28 against a strong MCC side at Lord's. Then came the Lancashire match at Old Trafford Cricket Ground.

In Lancashire's first innings, King bowled 27 overs and took 5 wickets for 46 runs. The Philadelphians passed Lancashire's first innings score, but their lead was quickly overtaken in Lancashire's second innings. With the wind strong over King's left shoulder, the scene was set for him to dominate the opposition. In his first over after the lunch break on day two of the match, he yorked one of Lancashire's opening batsmen and his replacement with successive balls. He clean bowled two more batsmen in his second over, and bowled a stump out of the ground in the third. In 3 overs, he had taken 5 wickets for 7 runs. After this performance, King had to be rested in the field. One batsman was run out before King returned to take 4 more wickets, ending the innings with 9 for 62. The Philadelphians won next morning by nine wickets.

Against Surrey on August 6, King was overpowering again. It was in this match that King gave what Barker called his finest first-class performance ever. Batting first, he scored 98 runs in the Philadelphian's first innings before being run out, and he then took 3 for 89 in Surrey's reply. In the second innings, he made 113 not out and then took 3 for 98. Surrey lost the match by 110 runs. Apparently, King was so exhausted after his performance that he fell asleep during a speech by the Lord Chief Justice Lord Alverstone at a banquet after the match.

=== Tour of England in 1908 ===
King toured England with the Philadelphians a third time in 1908. This tour included both first-class matches and more minor ones. The first match that was played was against South Wales in Cardiff. The Philadelphians won by 36 runs behind the bowling of King and Ranji Hordern. The pair took all 20 wickets of the Welsh side. After this, the first-class matches began with Worcestershire on July 9. Again the Philadelphians won and again Hordern and King took most of the wickets. This trend continued throughout the tour. In the first-class matches that King played, the Philadelphians recorded four wins and six losses. Although he was already 35 years old, King had posted extraordinary numbers in his bowling. He topped the bowling averages for the entire 1908 English cricket season at 11.01. This mark was not bettered until 1958, when Les Jackson of Derbyshire posted an average of 10.99.

=== Later career ===
King's cricketing career did not end with his last first-class match. He continued to play club matches in Philadelphia and participated in non-first-class fixtures around the continent. King is noted for holding the bowling record against Canada. On a rainy afternoon at Philadelphia in 1906, King bowled into a slight breeze to capture 8 wickets for 17 runs. This record came in a four-year period during which King focused on club cricket in Philadelphia, when he won the city's batting award three times and the bowling award four times.

King played in his last two international matches in 1912, against Australia. His performances were of the highest quality, given that he was nearing his fortieth year. In the first match, he took 9 wickets for 78 runs to help Philadelphia win by 2 runs; in the second, Australia won by 45 runs despite him taking 8 for 74.

King joined the Philadelphia Cricket Club after the 1912 season. Despite being well past his 40th year, he continued to play competitive cricket for another 4 years. His 27-year career ended with his last game for the Philadelphia Cricket Club against Frankford, on July 20, 1916. On this occasion, his bowling and batting skills had declined, but he maintained a batting average of 43.33 for that final season.

== Death ==
King died at a nursing home in his native Philadelphia in 1965, two days short of his 92nd birthday. The Times newspaper in the UK ran an obituary for him, which quoted Plum Warner as saying that: "Had he been an Englishman or an Australian, he would have been even more famous than he was."

== Achievements and legacy ==
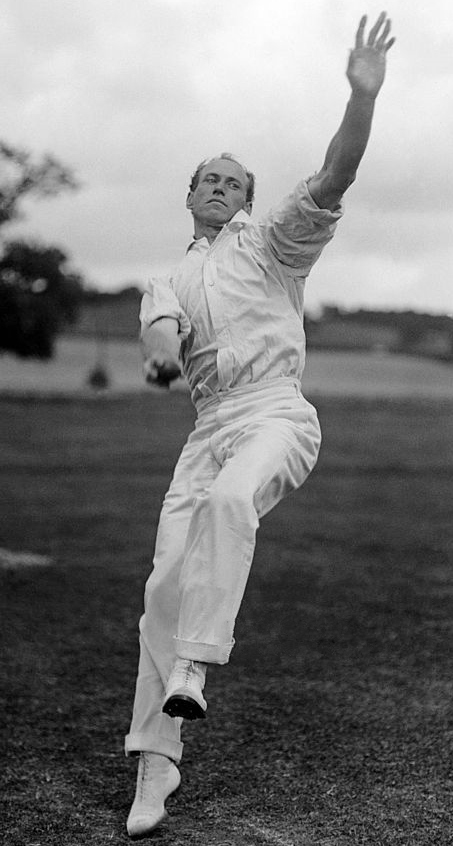
Bart King's bowling delivery

Though King focused on bowling throughout his career, he was also a very fine batsman. In 1905, he established a North American record batting record by scoring 315 at the Germantown Cricket Club. The following year, he scored 344 not out for Belmont against the Merion Cricket Club, setting a North American batting record which still stands. He scored 39 centuries in his North American career, and he topped 1,000 runs in six seasons. He took over 100 wickets in eight seasons, including a double of 1,000 runs and 100 wickets in four seasons. In his whole career, he scored 19,808 runs at an average of 36.47, and took 2,088 wickets at an average of 10.47. He took all 10 wickets in an innings on three occasions, and took 9 wickets in an innings five times. One of these occasions, in the Gentlemen of Ireland's first innings in 1909, was followed by a hat-trick in the second innings.

There is an apocryphal story of King emulating a famous baseball pitcher of the day, Rube Waddell, by sending all his fielders back into the pavilion and finishing off the opponent's innings on his own. King and Belmont were playing Trenton in the Halifax Cup at Elmwood Cricket Ground. Some versions of the story have him banishing the fielders and then calling one of them to a position 22 yards (20 m) back and 4 yards (3.7 m) to the leg side. This fielder was stationed there to pick up the bails which landed at his feet after King bowled his trademark "angler". This story was disputed some years later by the captain of Trenton, who claimed that when he "went in to bat that afternoon, King had four balls left in his over." He claimed to have "hit the first delivery to cover point but of course there was no one there. The ball stopped within three feet of the boundary, and King had to chase it. By the time he got back we had run six." The captain claimed to be the only batsmen to have hit four consecutive sixes off King, but commended the bowler on his ability to spin a tale.

Thanks to his dominant performance over his career and his renown in the world of cricket, King was elected an honorary member of the Incogniti Cricket Club in 1908 and an honorary life member of the Marylebone Cricket Club in 1962. When Plum Warner was asked to name the greatest bowler who ever lived, he said that John Barton King, "at the top of his power and speed, was at least the equal of the greatest of them all."

King is credited as one of the first bowlers to utilise swing bowling deliberately. Other bowlers in his time could sometimes get the ball to swing, but King was one of the first to do so at will with an old or new ball. He made use of a lethal delivery which he called the "angler", a product of his experience as a baseball pitcher, to confuse the English batsmen. He would come in with the ball clasped above his head in both hands as would a baseball pitcher. He was famous for his late swing—in and out—and would produce the in-swinger with his right hand coming down from a point over his left shoulder. He described it as an in-swinger which, if properly bowled, would change direction sharply in the last 10 or 15 feet (4.6 m) of flight. King used this ball only sparingly and only against good batsmen. After a tour to Philadelphia by an Australian side in 1896, George Giffen said "the Philadelphians really have some high-class players, but it was the fact of their bowlers playing us with baseball curves that upset our batsmen."

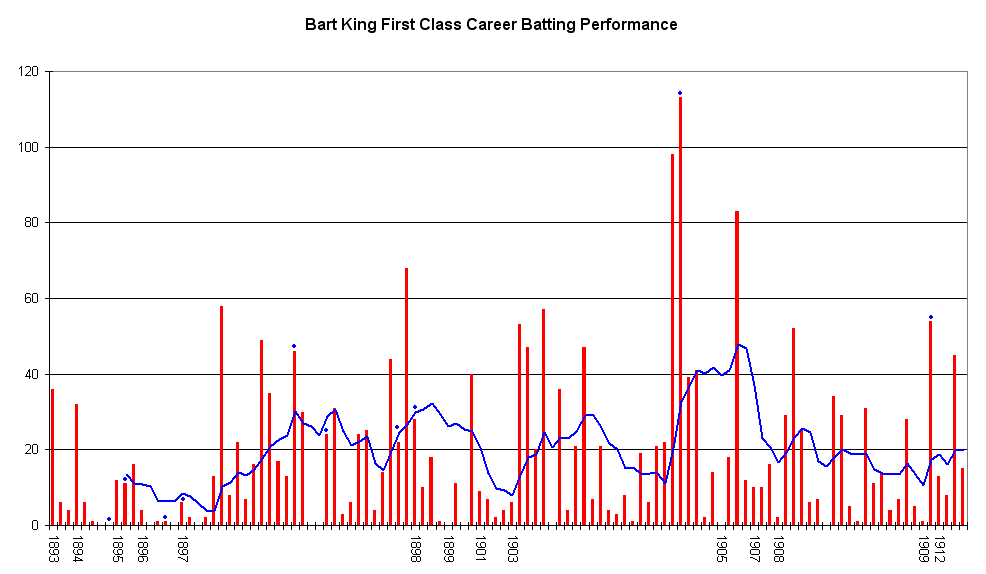
King's First-class batting career, showing runs scored (red bars) and the average of the last ten innings (blue line).
