= George Patterson (cricketer) =

American cricketer

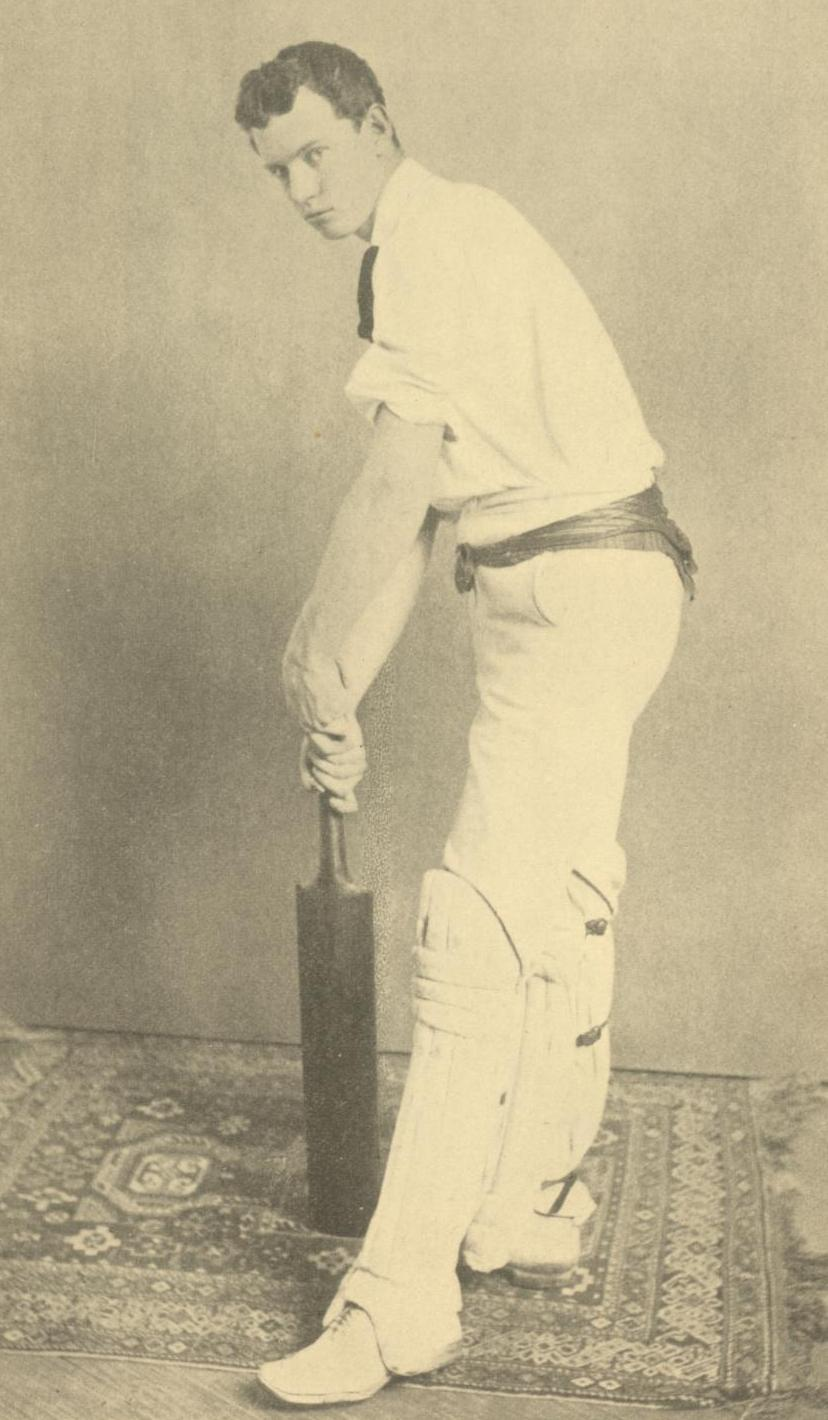
- Patterson in 1884

Personal information
- Full name: George Stuart Patterson
- Born: October 10, 1868
- Died: May 7, 1943 (aged 74)
- Batting: Right-handed
- Bowling: Right-arm medium

Career statistics
Competition	First-class
Matches	36
Runs scored	2,051
Batting average	39.44
100s/50s	5/11
Top score	271
Balls bowled	3,954
Wickets	74
Bowling average	21.22
5 wickets in innings	2
10 wickets in match	1
Best bowling	5/22
Catches/stumpings	14/0
- Source: Cricket Archive, April 15, 2021

George Stuart Patterson (October 10, 1868 – May 7, 1943) was an American cricketer, active in the late 19th century. Patterson played most notably for the Philadelphians, which flourished from the end of the 19th century until the outbreak of World War I. His obituary in Wisden Cricketers' Almanack described him as "one of the best all-round cricketers ever produced by America." He had a successful career with both Haverford College and the University of Pennsylvania and began playing first-class cricket when he was only 16 years old.

== Cricketing career ==
Patterson first played club cricket in Philadelphia for the Germantown Cricket Club. He stood over six feet tall and was of slim build, batted in good style and bowled right-arm medium-pace. His first international tour occurred in 1889 when he came to England with the Gentlemen of Philadelphia. Patterson scored 529 runs, average 40.69, and headed the batting figures for the visitors. He also took 42 wickets at 23 runs each. On this tour, the Philadelphians also stopped in Ireland for a draw against that side. Patterson only scored 38 runs in the match but took 10 wickets. They then proceeded to beat Scotland by ten wickets and the Gentlemen of Hampshire by two runs.

=== Tour of England in 1897 ===
George Patterson in 1897

In 1897 Patterson captained his next tour of England. The tour undertaken by the Philadelphian cricketers was very ambitious. Though the results may have been less satisfactory than hoped for by promoters, the tour was arranged mainly for educational purposes and few of those on the American side expected to win many matches. Previous tours had tended to involve amateur English sides with a low level of competition. In 1897 a schedule was made including all of the top county cricket teams, the Oxford and Cambridge University teams, the Marylebone Cricket Club, and two other sides, though only a few of the counties thought it worth while to put their best elevens onto the field. Starting on June 7 at Oxford, the tour lasted for two months and ended in late July at The Oval. While it initially aroused some curiosity, many English fans lost interest until Patterson and the Philadelphians met the full Sussex team at Brighton on June 17. The team fared very well and soundly beat the English side. Patterson, though, had a relatively poor performance scoring only eight runs and not taking any wickets. The star of the match was undoubtedly John Barton King.

Despite the excitement surrounding King's performance, the Americans did not fare well overall on the tour. Fifteen matches were played, but only two were won while the team lost nine and earned a draw on four. The other win of the tour came against Warwickshire, though Patterson also performed poorly in this match. Patterson was second in his team's averages with 33, his best innings was 162 at Trent Bridge against Nottinghamshire. There were some claims, though, in the Philadelphia Public Ledger that the Philadelphians had been treated unfairly by the English umpires, but captain Patterson put those rumors to rest with a letter to the editor of an American newspaper:

My attention has been directed to a letter signed W.S. in the Field of July 24th, enclosing a clipping from the Philadelphia Public Ledger, severely criticising the umpiring in the Philadelphian matches during our tour through England. I wish to state on behalf of the Philadelphia team that the sentiments expressed in the clipping are not those of the team, and that we emphatically repudiate any insinuation of unfair treatment. On the contrary, we have been received with the most unvarying courtesy and fairness both on and off the field. I wish to take this opportunity of making a public acknowledgement of our indebtedness to Mr. Perkins, of the M.C.C., for the umpires assigned to us, and to testify, unnecessary though it be, to their ability and integrity.

The match that the Philadelphians played against the MCC was to be Patterson's last first-class cricket match.

=== Other matches ===
At the club and first-class level in the United States, Patterson continued to show his batting skill. His highest score in a first-class match was 271. This is still the record first-class score for a player from a non-Test nation. Four times he exceeded a thousand runs in a season, and in 1891, besides making 1,402 (average 50), he took 112 wickets at 7.97 each. With F. H. Bohlen, who died in December 1942, Patterson made 200 for the first wicket against Frank Mitchell's University team that visited Philadelphia in 1895. Patterson died in Philadelphia in 1943 at the age of 74.
