= Belmont Cricket Club =

Defunct sports club in Philadelphia

Coordinates: 39.943173°N 75.217166°W

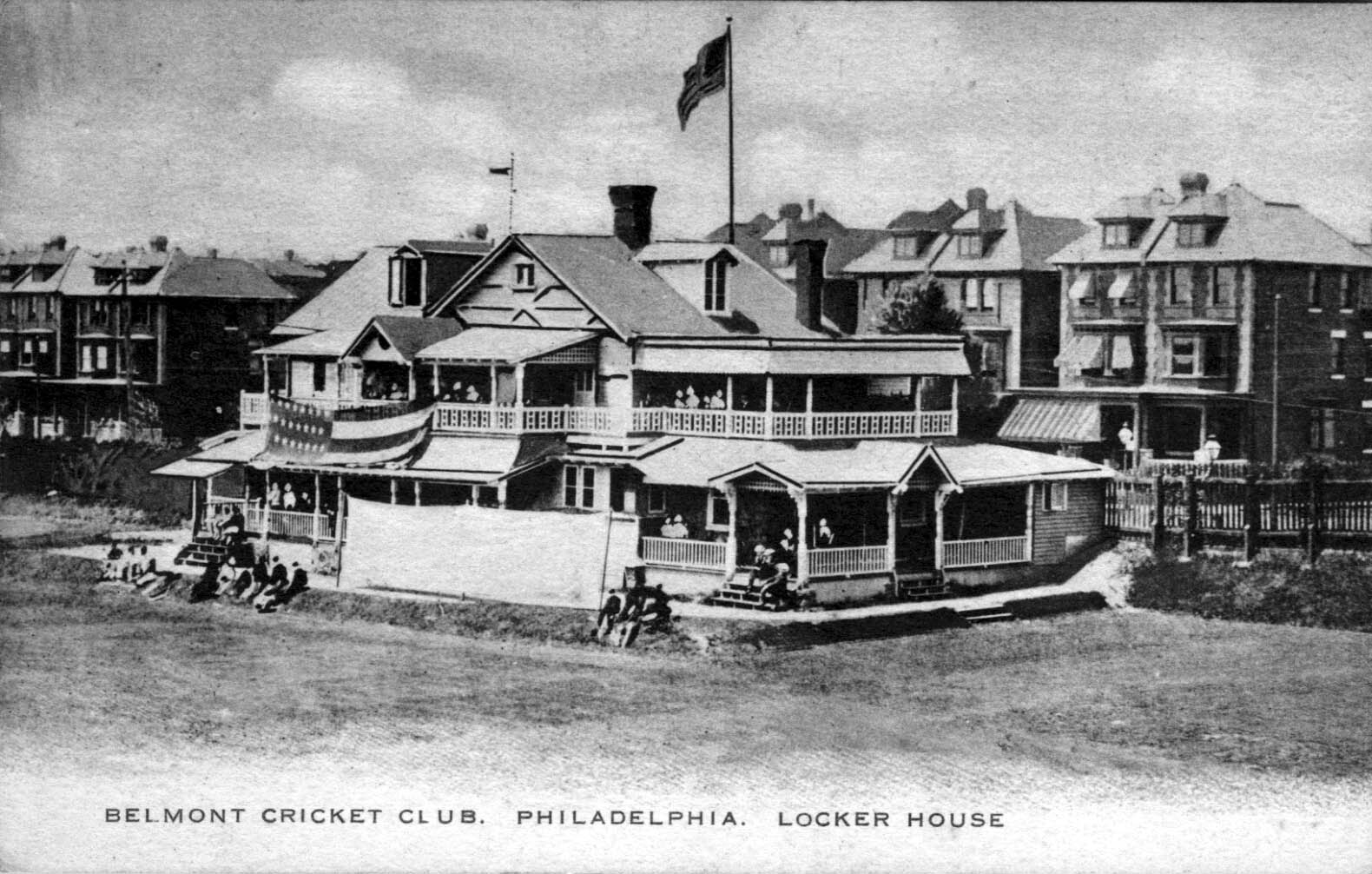
- Belmont clubhouse
- Formation: 1874
- Dissolved: 1914; 112 years ago
- Type: Sports club
- Location: Philadelphia, PA, United States

The Belmont Cricket Club was one of four chief cricket clubs in Philadelphia, Pennsylvania, that played from its 1874 founding in West Philadelphia until its disbanding in 1914.

== Players ==
Bart King, arguably America's greatest cricketer during its 1890-1914 golden age, played for Belmont from 1893 to 1913. Another famous American cricketer, English-born Cecil Hurditch, played for Belmont in 1912 after he returned from playing for the Santa Monica Cricket Club in southern California.

== Soccer ==
By 1902, soccer had become popular among cricket clubs in Philadelphia so they established a league, named "Philadelphia Cricket Clubs League". Belmont, along with Germantown, Kensington, and Frankford, was among its founding members.

The Belmont team participated in the ACCL championships from 1901 to 1912.

In 1913, Hurditch introduced soccer to the club members.

== See also ==
- History of United States cricket § Philadelphia cricket
- Philadelphia Cricket Club
- Germantown Cricket Club
- Merion Cricket Club
