= Philadelphian cricket team =

Cricket team in the US

Philadelphia
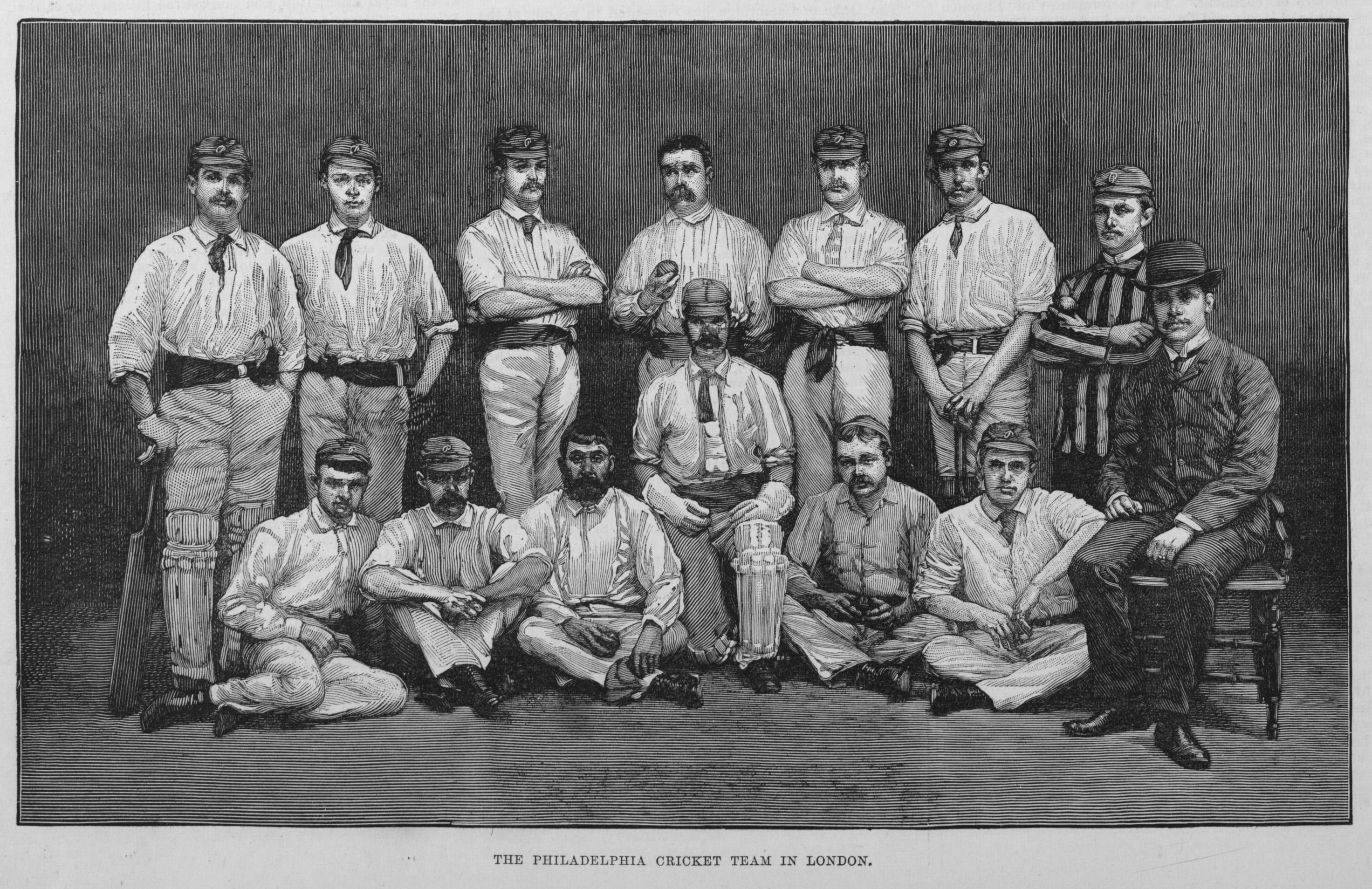
- 1884 squad of the Philadelphian cricket team as depicted in the Illustrated London News

Team information
- Founded: 1878
- Last match: June 28, 1913 v Australia at Merion Cricket Club, Philadelphia
- As of March 24, 2010

The Philadelphian cricket team was a team that represented Philadelphia, Pennsylvania, in first-class cricket between 1878 and 1913. Even with the United States having played the first ever international cricket match against Canada in 1844, the sport began a slow decline in the U.S. This decline was furthered by the rise in popularity of baseball. In Philadelphia, however, the sport remained very popular and from the end of the 19th century until the outbreak of World War I, the city produced a first class team that rivaled many others in the world. The team was composed of players from the four chief cricket clubs in Philadelphia–Germantown, Merion, Belmont, and Philadelphia. Players from smaller clubs, such as Tioga and Moorestown Cricket Club, and local colleges, such as Haverford and Penn, also played for the Philadelphians. Over its 35 years, the team played in 88 first-class cricket matches. Of those, 29 were won, 45 were lost, 13 were drawn and one game was abandoned before completion.

== History ==
=== 1870s and 1880s ===
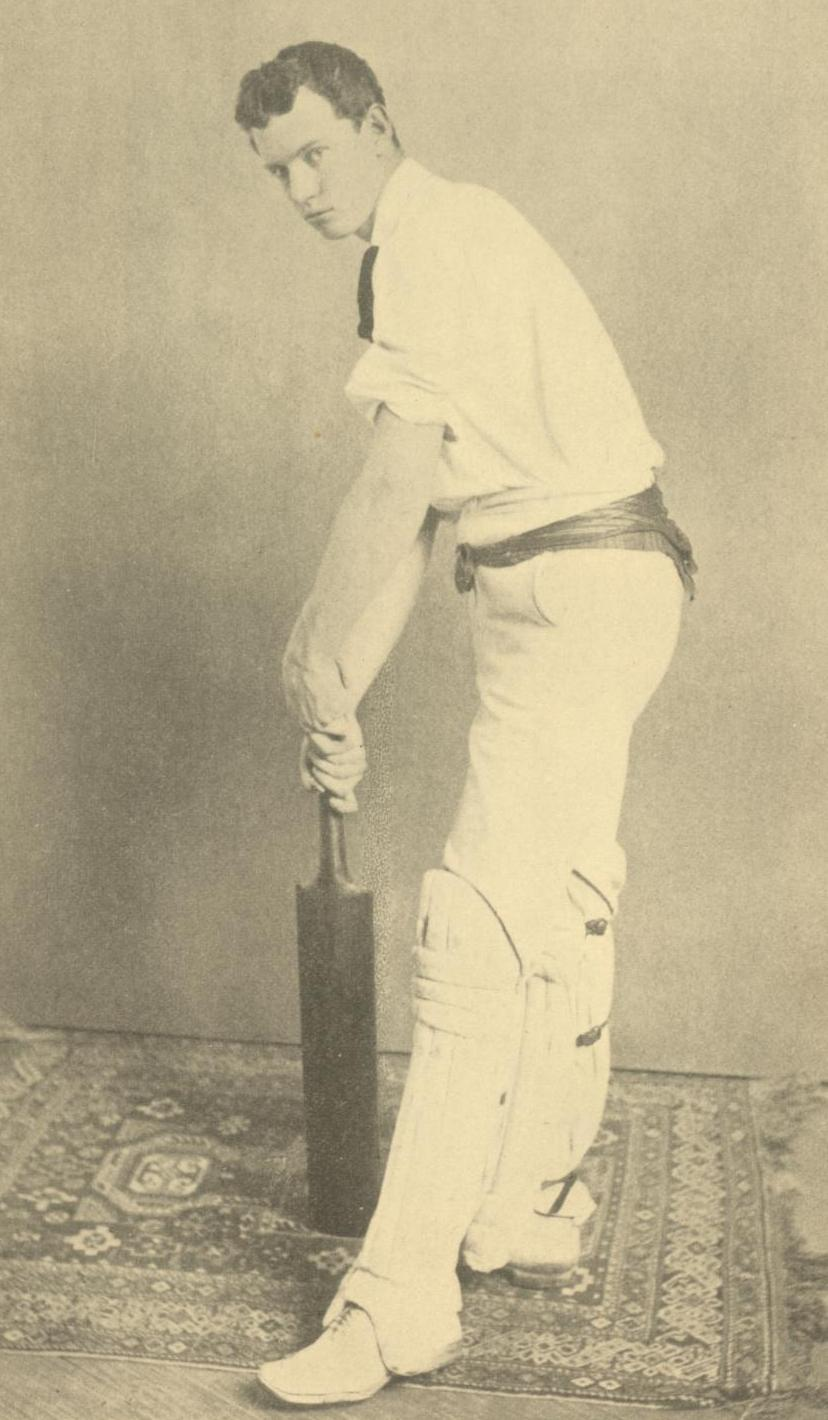
George Patterson President of University of Pennsylvania Cricket team in 1887 and member of Penn Class of 1888, still holds the North American batting record with 271

When Fitz Fitzgerald's team from England toured North America in 1872, they played a match against Philadelphia over three days beginning on September 21. The match was played at the Germantown Cricket Club Ground, Nicetown, Philadelphia. It was not a first-class fixture, the Philadelphians having 22 players and the visitors, who won by 4 wickets, having 12. Amongst the English players were W. G. Grace, the future Lord Harris and A. N. Hornby. Grace did little as a batsman, but took 21 wickets (out of a possible 42) in the match.

The first time that the Gentlemen of Philadelphia played a first-class cricket match was on October 3, 1878 against Australia. This match took place on the Australians' trip home after playing in England earlier in the year. The game was a three-day match, and finished in a low scoring draw, with Australia still needing 43 runs when the game ended. The following year saw Ireland visit for two matches against the Philadelphians. The first match was a two-day game which the home side won by an innings. This was followed by a one-day game which was won by the Irish.

The next time the Philadelphians played in a first-class match was in 1883, when they played the USA national side in a first-class match. They lost this game by 8 wickets, but gained revenge when the fixture was played again the next year, winning by 3 wickets. This match then became an occasional game played between the best amateur players of Philadelphia and the country's best professionals. The fixture was played six times between 1885 and 1894. Also in 1884, the Gentlemen of Philadelphia toured the United Kingdom. In 1885, a team from England organized by Edward (Ned) Sanders visited Philadelphia, playing two first-class matches. The English side, captained by Richard Thornton, split the series with the Philadelphians. The team toured again the following year with more success, winning both matches. In 1888 Ireland visited Philadelphia, playing two first-class games which were both won by the Philadelphians. The final tour of the decade came in 1889 when the Gentlemen of Philadelphia again toured the UK.

=== 1890s ===
The decade of the 1890s marks the golden age of Philadelphian cricket. This was the period in which the most well-known players from the team made their marks. The first match of the decade for the Philadelphians that is classified as first-class was played against a team of English Residents. This fixture had been played annually from 1880 to 1883. This was the last time it was played, and the only time it featured a team specifically named as the Philadelphians, who won the game by six wickets. In 1891 a team led by Lord Hawke visited from England, playing two matches. The Philadelphians won a high-scoring first match but the tourists won a low-scoring second match, Sammy Woods taking 15 wickets.

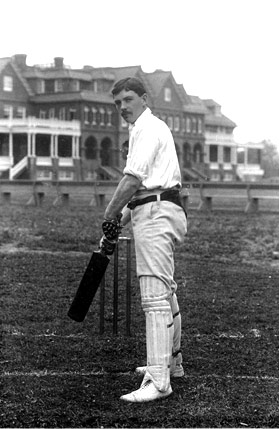
John Lester maintained a batting average of 33.14 in his first-class career

1892 saw Ireland visit Philadelphia. The teams each won one match, with one game drawn. This series was notable as it was the debut of Bart King, who would go on to a successful career bowling for the Philadelphians. The following year saw the first visit of Australia since the game in 1878. It visited on its way home from a tour of England. Australia fielded a strong side, but the team was tired after a long tour and trip. In spite of this fatigue, the Australians chose to face the full strength of the Gentlemen of Philadelphia. On a small ground at Elmwood, the September grass was coarse and rolled very fast. The Australian side, fielding first, dropped many balls and could not cope with the short boundary. They allowed the Philadelphians to run up a total of 525 runs. When the Australians came to bat, they had hoped that they were recovered from their journey, but they soon encountered Bart King's developing swing. The side was all out for 199, and King took 5 wickets for 78 runs. The Australians followed on and were all out again for 268, allowing the Gentlemen of Philadelphia to win by an innings and 68 runs. This win came about with the help of Bart King's batting and, more importantly, his bowling. The Australians won the return match by six wickets, but the Australian captain, Jack Blackham, said to the Americans, "You have better players here than we have been led to believe. They class with England’s best."

In 1894 a second team led by Lord Hawke visited from England, playing two matches. Lord Hawke's XI won the first match at Merion with the Philadelphians coming back to win the second at Germantown's Manheim ground.

In 1897, the Philadelphian side toured England for 15 first class matches. Though the results may have been less satisfactory than hoped for by the promoters, the tour was arranged mainly for educational purposes and few of those on the American side expected to win many matches. Previous tours had tended to involve amateur English sides with a low level of competition. In 1897 a schedule was made including all of the top county cricket teams, the Oxford and Cambridge University teams, the Marylebone Cricket Club, and two other sides, though only a few of the counties thought it worthwhile to put their best elevens onto the field. Starting on June 7 at Oxford, the tour lasted for two months and ended in late July at The Oval. While it initially aroused some curiosity, many English fans lost interest until Bart King and the Philadelphians met the full Sussex team at Brighton on June 17. In the first innings, King proved his batting worth in a fourth-wicket stand of 107 with John Lester. He then took 7 wickets for 13 runs and the team dismissed Sussex for 46 in less than an hour. In the second innings, King took 6 for 102 and helped the Philadelphians to a victory by 8 wickets. Despite the excitement surrounding the team's performance, the Americans did not fare well overall. Fifteen matches were played, but only two were won, while the team lost nine and drew four. The other win of the tour came against Warwickshire.

This tour was followed by a two-game series at home against a team captained by Plum Warner in which each team won a match. Warner again brought a team the following year, this time winning both games. The decade was rounded out with a tour by a team captained by Kumar Shri Ranjitsinhji. This team won both matches against the Philadelphians in 1899.

=== 1900s and 1910s ===
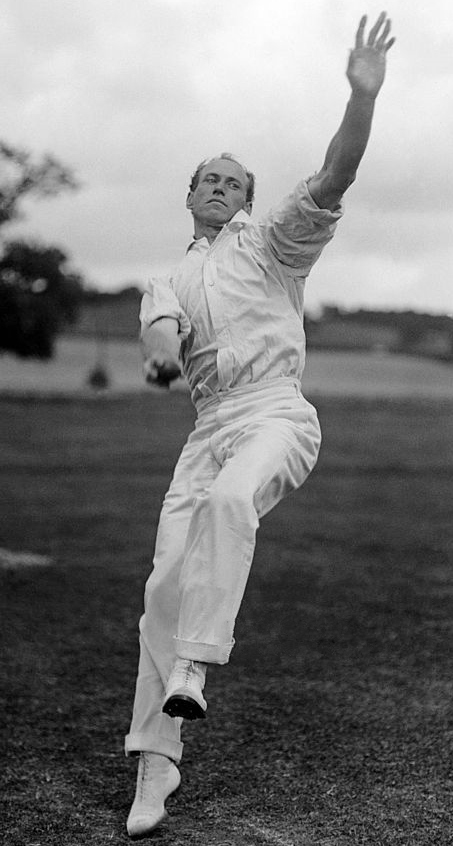
John Barton King is widely considered to be the best bowler produced by the United States

In 1901 Bernard Bosanquet brought an English team to Philadelphia. The four match series ended tied. The Philadelphians again toured England in 1903, playing 15 first-class games. The team was more successful than in 1897, this time winning six, losing six and drawing three. Bart King continued his successful form on this tour. In the first innings against Lancashire, he bowled 27 overs and took 5 wickets for 46 runs. After the Philadelphians surpassed Lancashire, their lead was quickly wiped away in the second innings. With the wind strong over King’s left shoulder he went in to dominate the opposition. In his first over after the lunch break, he yorked one of the opening batsmen and his replacement with successive balls. In the second over he clean bowled two more batsmen, and in the third he bowled a stump out of the ground. He had taken 5 wickets for 7 runs. After this performance, King had to be rested in the field and one wicket was taken. On his return, he took four more to finish with 9 for 62. The Philadelphians won next morning by nine wickets. The tour of England was followed the same year by a visit from Kent to Philadelphia. The Marylebone Cricket Club visited for two tours in 1905 and 1907. The first series was drawn one game to one, and the second tour saw both games drawn.

In 1908 the Philadelphians undertook their third and final tour of England. They played ten first-class games on this tour, winning four and losing six. The tour was highlighted by Bart King, who took 87 wickets and topped the England bowling averages with the figure of 11.01. This was not bettered until 1958 when Les Jackson of Derbyshire posted an average of 10.99. They played three first-class games in Jamaica in 1908–09, their only tour of a country other than England. In 1909, the Philadelphians played a two match home series against Ireland, in which they won both games by an innings. In the first of these games, Bart King took all ten Irish wickets in the first innings, and followed up that with a hat-trick in the second innings.

The second decade of the twentieth century was the last for first-class cricket in Philadelphia, with baseball increasing its dominance over American sports. With the formation of the Imperial Cricket Conference in 1909 specifically excluding countries from outside the British Empire, American cricket had little influence on the global game. This exclusionary policy undercut any momentum to professionalize cricket in the USA. There were still two more first-class tours by Australia, however. The first was a drawn two match series in 1912. The final series was a three match affair, with the Australians winning two games, and one drawn. The drawn game, played on June 28, 1913 was the last first-class game played in the USA until the national side played an Intercontinental Cup game against Canada in Fort Lauderdale, Florida in 2004. Today, cricket is played in Philadelphia, but it has not reached the same heights it did during this golden age.

== Summary of first-class matches ==
Note: This table includes first-class matches played by both the Philadelphians and the Gentlemen of Philadelphia

Opposition	P	W	D	L	A	Sources
Australia	11	3	2	6	0	
BJT Bosanquet's XI	2	1	0	1	0	
Cambridge University	2	0	0	2	0	
Derbyshire	1	1	0	0	0	
EJ Sander's XI	4	1	0	3	0	
English Residents	1	1	0	0	0	
F Mitchell's XI	2	1	0	1	0	
Gloucestershire	2	1	0	1	0	
Hampshire	3	1	1	1	0	
Ireland	3	3	0	0	0	
Lord Hawke's XI	4	1	0	3	0	
Jamaica	3	2	0	1	0	
Kent	5	1	0	4	0	
Lancashire	2	1	0	1	0	
MCC	7	2	2	3	0	
Middlesex	2	0	0	2	0	
Northamptonshire	1	0	0	1	0	
Nottinghamshire	3	1	1	1	0	
Oxford University	2	0	2	0	0	
Oxford University Past and Present	1	0	0	1	0	
PF Warner's XI	5	1	0	4	0	
Players of USA	6	2	3	1	0	
KS Ranjitsinhji's XI	2	0	0	2	0	
Somerset	2	0	1	1	0	
Surrey	3	1	0	2	0	
Sussex	2	1	0	0	1	
USA	2	1	0	1	0	
Warwickshire	2	1	0	1	0	
Worcestershire	2	1	0	1	0	
Yorkshire	1	0	1	0	0	
Totals	88	29	13	45	1	

== Notable players ==
- Francis Bohlen (1868–1942)
- Percy Clark – a bowler with a career average of 21.97.
- Nelson Graves – made his first-class debut at age 14.
- "Ranji" Hordern – Australian Test cricketer who played for Philadelphia between 1907 and 1909
- Bart King – almost universally recognized as the greatest American cricketer of all time.
- John Lester – led the team's batting averages from 1897 until his retirement in 1908.
- Christie Morris – the CC Morris Cricket Library at Haverford College, the largest collection of cricket literature and memorabilia in the western hemisphere, was named after him.
- George Patterson – made the highest first-class score by a player from a non-Test nation.
- Henry Scattergood – was a successful wicket-keeper for the team.
- John B. Thayer – had a short career with the team but is notable as the only first-class cricketer to have died on the RMS Titanic.
- Willard Graham, also member of the combined Canada-USA team against Australia in 1913
- Henry Sayen – the first American to play for the Gentlemen of England

== See also ==
- Harold Furness
- United States cricket team
