= Germantown Cricket Club =

Sports club in Philadelphia, Pennsylvania

- The Germantown Cricket Club
- Formation: 1854; 172 years ago
- Type: Social club
- Tax ID no.: 23-0620930
- Location: Germantown, PA, United States
- Website: germantowncricket.org
- Germantown Cricket Club
- U.S. National Register of Historic Places
- U.S. National Historic Landmark
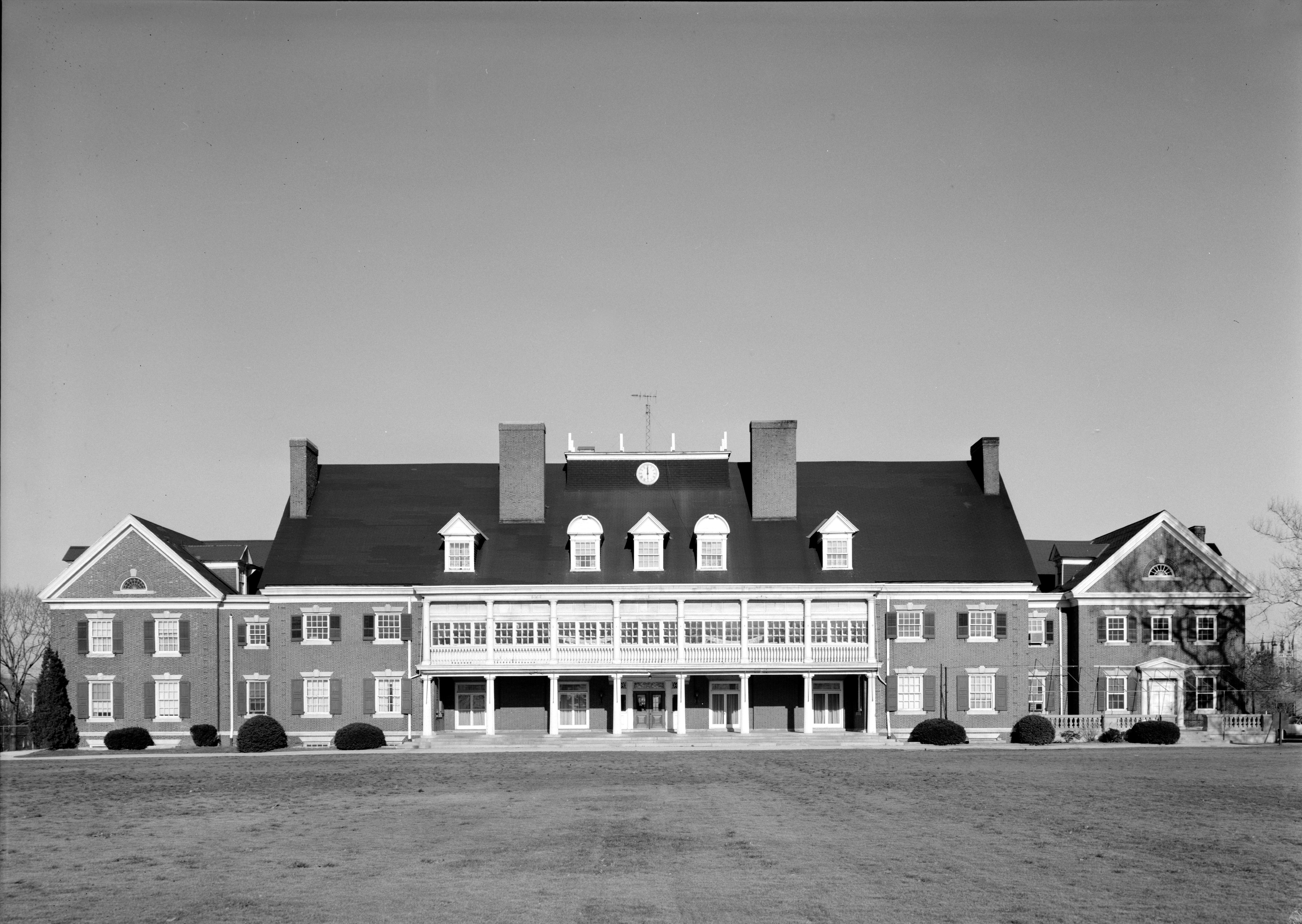
- Clubhouse of the Germantown C.C. c. 1933

- Location within Philadelphia Location within Pennsylvania Location within the United States
- Location: 5140 Morris St. Philadelphia, Pennsylvania
- Coordinates: 40°1′25.10″N 75°10′24.31″W
- Built: 1890
- Architect: Charles F. McKim of McKim, Mead & White
- Architectural style: Colonial Revival, Queen Anne
- NRHP reference No.: 87000758
- Added to NRHP: February 27, 1987

The Germantown Cricket Club is a private social and sports club in the Germantown neighborhood of Philadelphia, Pennsylvania. It was one of the four principal cricket clubs in the city and was one of the clubs contributing members to the Philadelphian cricket team. It was founded on August 10, 1854 in what is now the northwest section of the city, and is the nation's second oldest cricket club.

Its clubhouse, completed in 1890, was designed by architects McKim, Mead & White. Nowadays the club has facilities for cricket, tennis, squash, swimming, padel, and special events. The club's facilities are a designated National Historic Landmark.

== Overview ==
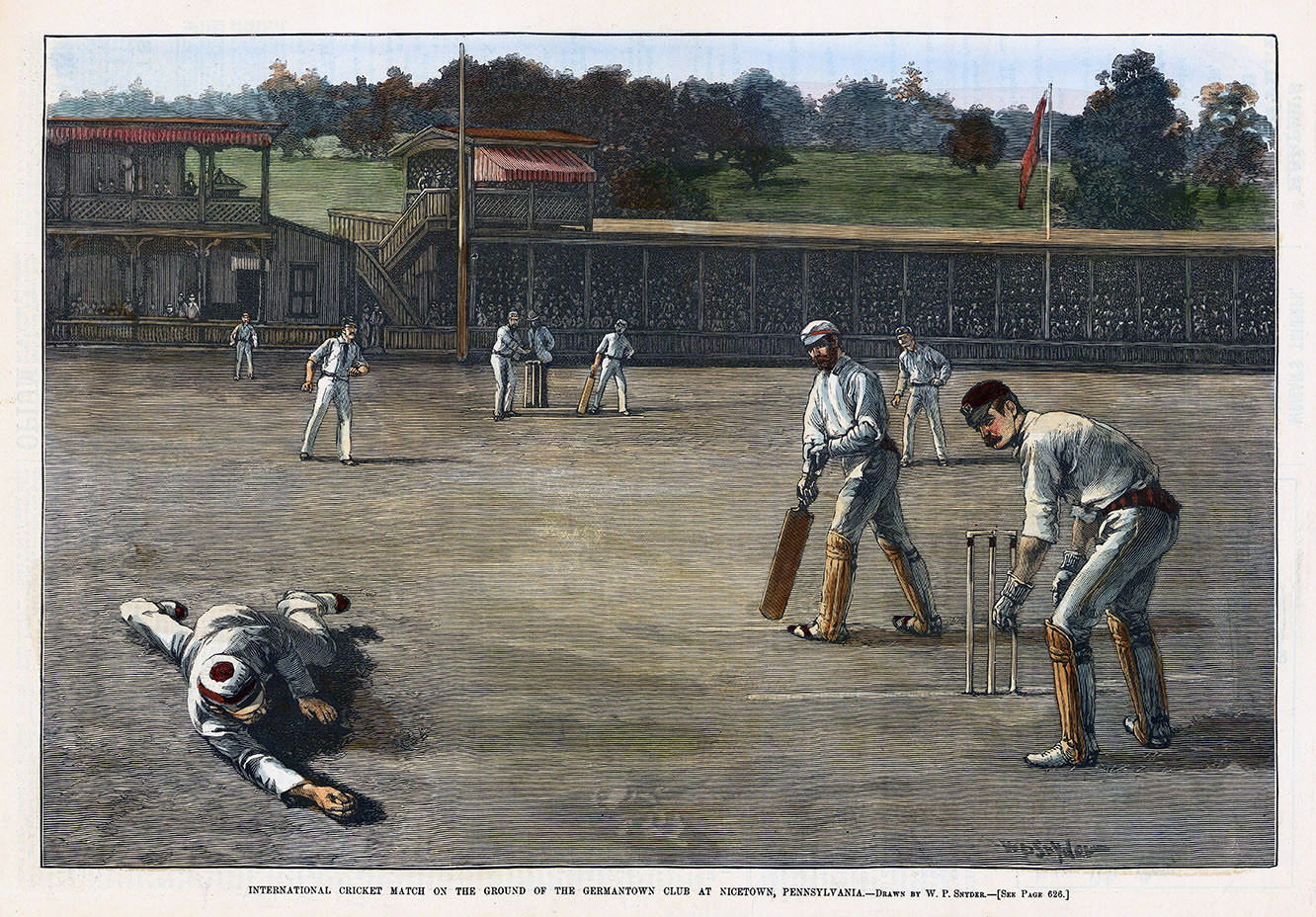
Illustration of a cricket match at Germantown Ground, 1886

The Germantown Cricket Club was located in Nicetown from 1877 until 1890 when it moved to its present Manheim Street location after merging with the Young America Cricket Club in 1890.

The Newhall brothers joined the Germantown cricket team at this time after being the backbone of the Young America Cricket Club for forty years.

The U.S. National tennis championship, precursor to today's US Open, was played on Germantown Cricket's lawn tennis courts from 1921 to 1923.

As of 2023, Germantown Cricket Club hosts the final of the Philadelphia International Cricket Festival.

In 1902, Germantown was one of the founding members of a soccer league founded by cricket clubs in Philadelphia; the league (named "Philadelphia Cricket Clubs League") also included Belmont, Kensington, and Frankford. The popularity of the sport also attracted other collegiate teams to the league, such as Haverford.

== See also ==
- Belmont Cricket Club – Defunct sports club in Philadelphia
- List of National Historic Landmarks in Philadelphia
- Merion Cricket Club – Country club in Haverford, Pennsylvania
- National Register of Historic Places listings in Northwest Philadelphia
- Philadelphia Cricket Club – Country club in Philadelphia
- Philadelphian cricket team – Cricket team in the US

| Preceded by West Side Tennis Club; New York City | Davis Cup; Final Venue; 1924 • 1925 • 1926 • 1927 | Succeeded by Stade Roland Garros; Paris |
| Preceded by Centre Court, Wimbledon; London | Davis Cup; Final Venue; 1938 | Succeeded by Merion Cricket Club; Haverford |
| Preceded by Queen's Club; London | Fed Cup; Final Venue; 1964 | Succeeded by Kooyong Stadium; Melbourne |

| Preceded by West Side Tennis Club; 1915-1920 | Home of the U.S. Championships; 1921-1923 | Succeeded by West Side Tennis Club; 1924-1977 |
