= Merion Cricket Club =

Country club in Haverford, Pennsylvania

- The Merion Cricket Club

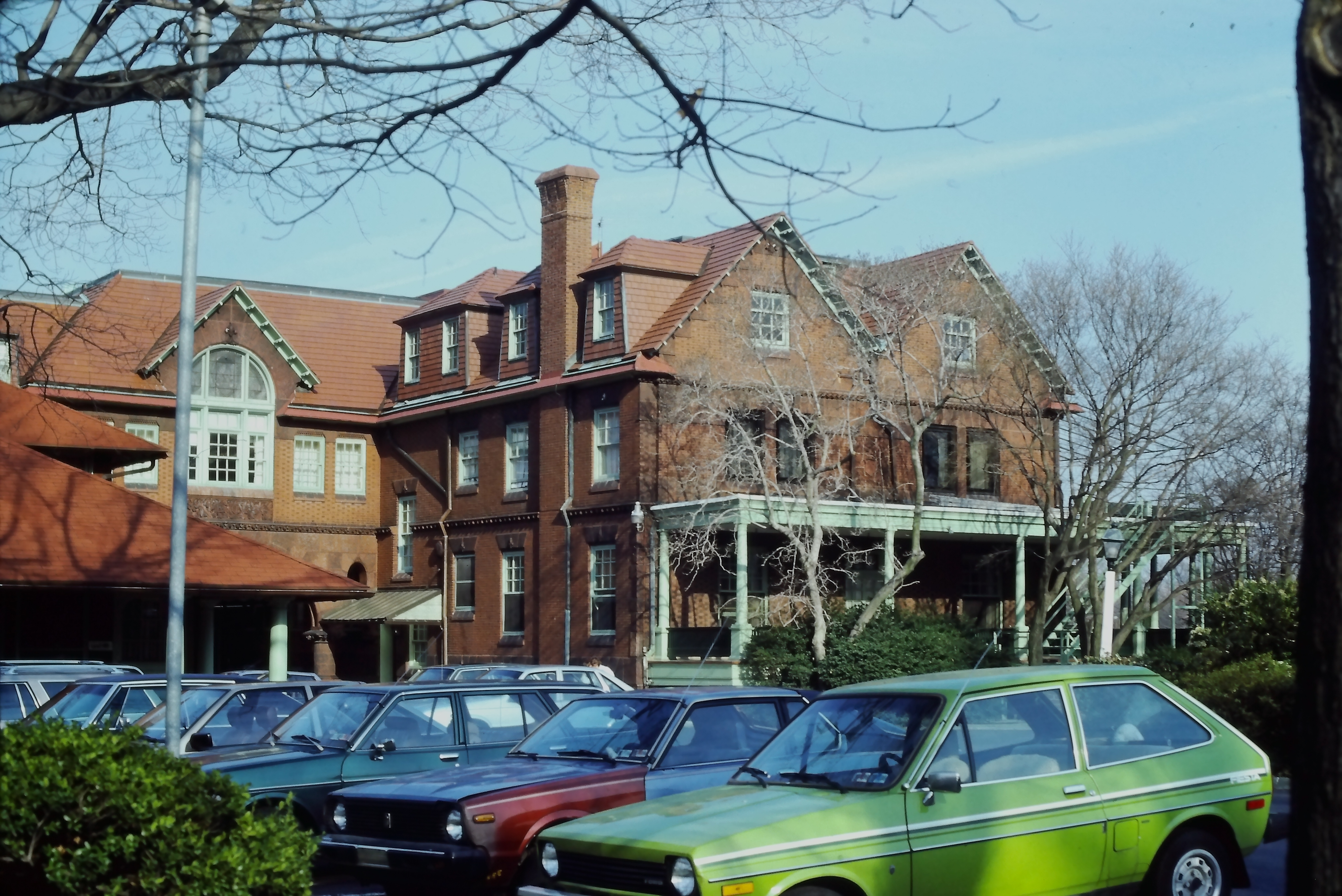
- The club as seen in 1986
- Formation: 1865; 161 years ago
- Type: Social club
- Location: Haverford, PA, United States
- Website: merioncricket.com
- Merion Cricket Club Main House
- U.S. National Register of Historic Places
- U.S. National Historic Landmark
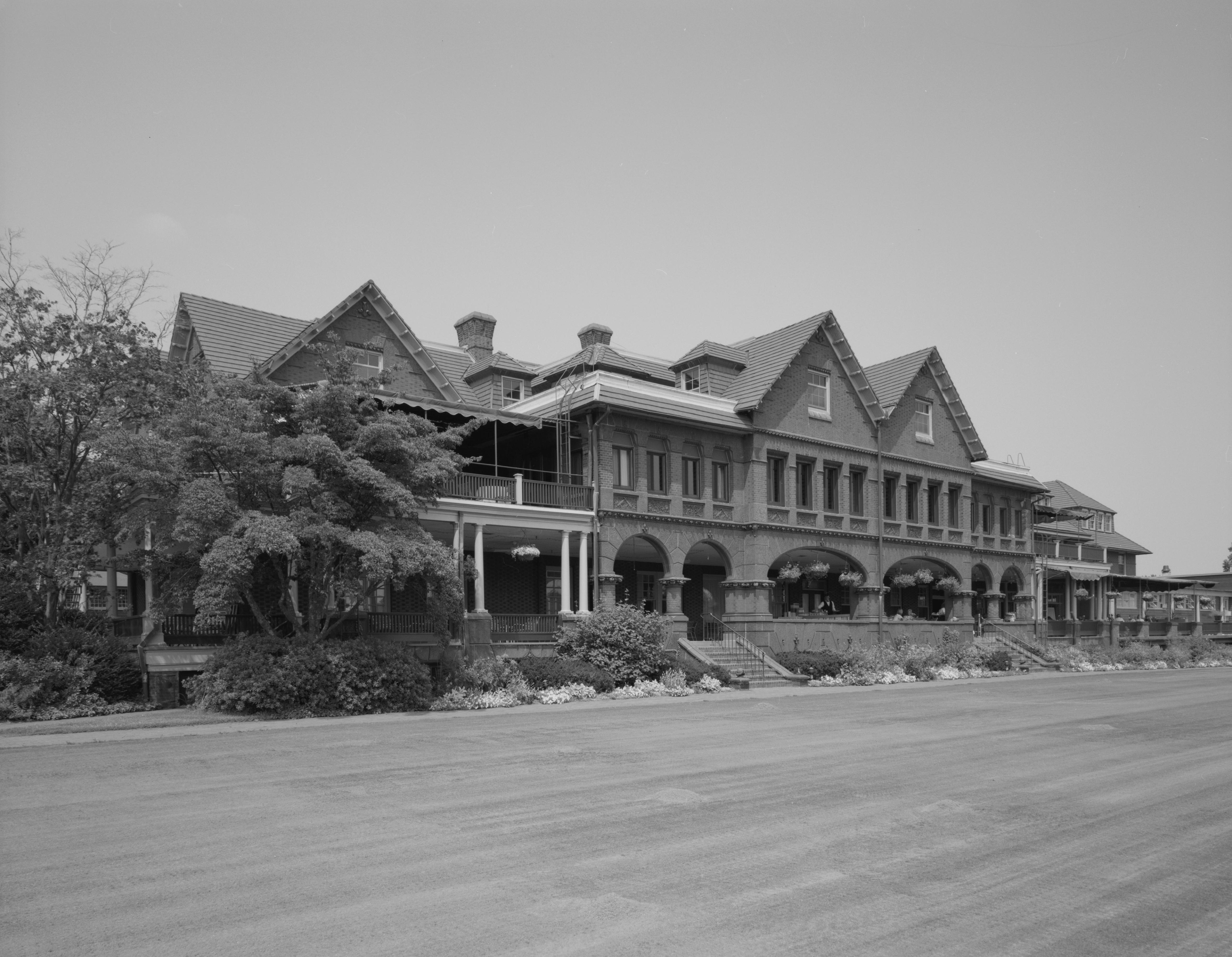
- The "Main House," of brick and stone, replaced a wooden clubhouse that was destroyed by fire in September 1896

- Location within Pennsylvania Location within the United States
- Location: Montgomery Avenue & Grays Lane, Haverford, Pennsylvania
- Coordinates: 40°0′56″N 75°17′53″W
- Built: 1897
- Architect: Allen Evans; Furness, Evans & Co.
- Architectural style: Late Victorian/Colonial Revival
- NRHP reference No.: 87000759

Significant dates
- Added to NRHP: February 27, 1987
- Designated NHL: February 27, 1987

Merion Cricket Club is a private social club which is located in Haverford, Pennsylvania. It was founded in 1865.

The current clubhouse is its sixth, the last four having been designed by Philadelphia architect Frank Furness and his partner, Allen Evans, who was also a founder of the club.

The club was designated a National Historic Landmark in 1987 for its leading role in the promotion, development and continued support of cricket, golf, squash, and tennis in the United States.

== History ==
The club was founded in October 1865 by William Woodrow Montgomery and Marshall Ewing. Its first meeting was held at Glenays, the home of William Woodrow Montgomery, on December 16, 1865. While there was some thought of converting into a baseball club due to a lack of a permanent facility, its first cricket match was held in Wynnewood, Pennsylvania, May 19, 1866.

From 1873 to 1892, the club occupied grounds in Ardmore, Pennsylvania, before moving to its present grounds in Haverford. The first tennis match was held in 1881; the first golf course was laid out in 1896, with other courses in 1912 and 1914.

From 1900 to 1934 and 1937 to 1941, the club hosted the NCAA Division I men's tennis championships.

Merion has also a past in soccer so by 1902, this sport had become popular among cricket clubs in Philadelphia so they decided to establish a league, named "Philadelphia Cricket Clubs League". The popularity of the sport also attracted other collegiate teams to the league, such as Haverford.

== Facilities ==
The first clubhouse (1865–73) was an existing house in Wynnewood, Pennsylvania, on land owned by Col. Owen Jones. The second (1873–80) was an industrial building in Ardmore, Pennsylvania, about a mile southeast of the current grounds. The third (1880–92), by Furness & Evans, on Cricket Avenue in Ardmore, was destroyed by fire in 1892.

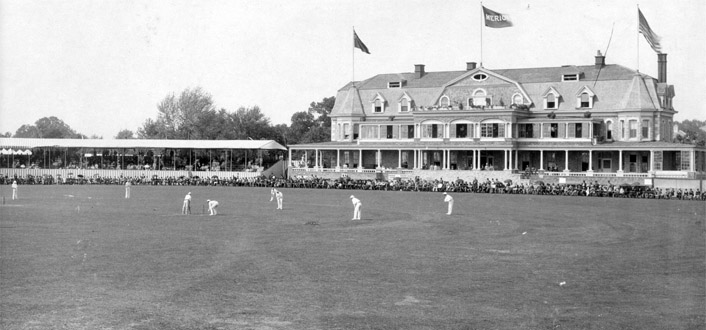
The fourth clubhouse (1892), backing onto Montgomery Avenue, was destroyed by fire in January 1896

The fourth (1892–96), at the present location, although backing onto Montgomery Avenue, was destroyed by fire in January 1896. The fifth (1896), backing onto Grays Lane, was destroyed by fire before its completion. The sixth (and present) clubhouse was built to the same plan as the fifth but in stone and brick. Alexander Cassatt, a vice-president of the Pennsylvania Railroad (later PRR president), paid for the fireproof clubhouse.

On the club grounds there are indoor and outdoor tennis courts, paddle tennis courts, padel courts, singles and doubles squash courts, a bowling alley, swimming pool, dining facilities and a ballroom. Seasonally, the club has croquet and cricket events.

The Club also fields an association football team known as the "Merion C.C. Football Club". The team competes annually for The Manheim Prize, the oldest amateur soccer trophy in the United States.

The Club's tennis and squash facilities have been host to many historically significant national and international championships.

== Merion Golf Club ==
In 1896 members of the Merion Cricket Club founded the Merion Golf Club which has hosted the U.S. Open five times, for the first time in 1934. In 1941, this became a separate club. The Merion Golf Club most recently hosted the U.S. Open in 2013.

== See also ==
- Philadelphia Cricket Club
- Germantown Cricket Club
- Belmont Cricket Club
- List of National Historic Landmarks in Pennsylvania

Preceded by Germantown Cricket Club; Philadelphia	Davis Cup; Final Venue; 1939	Succeeded by Kooyong Stadium; Melbourne
