= 1909–10 Columbia Lions men's soccer team =

American men's soccer season

1909–10 Columbia Lions men's soccer

ISFL National Champions
- Conference: ISFL
- Record: 10–2–3 (4–0–1 ISFL)
- Home stadium: Polo Grounds

1909–10 ISFL standings
	Conf.					Overall
Team	W		L		T	W		L		T
Columbia ‡	4	–	0	–	1	10	–	2	–	3
Harvard	2	–	2	–	1	3	–	9	–	1
Haverford	2	–	3	–	0	3	–	4	–	4
Yale	1	–	2	–	2	1	–	2	–	2
Penn	1	–	4	–	0	1	–	7	–	3
Cornell	1	–	4	–	0	1	–	4	–	0
‡-National champion

The 1909–10 Columbia Lions men's soccer team was a soccer team that represented Columbia University as during the 1909–10 ISFL season. It was the program's fifth season as a varsity team, and their first under the "Lions" moniker, after previously being referred to as the "Blue and White". The program is best known for winning the university's first national soccer championship, being deemed the ISFL national champions at the conclusion of the season, compiling a record of five wins, no losses, and one draw across ISFL play.

Today, they are recognized by American Soccer History Archives as the 1910 college soccer champions.

== Schedule ==
Date Time, TV	Rank^{#}	Opponent^{#}	Result	Record	Site City, State
Non-conference regular season
*		Montclair	W 4–1	1–0–0	Polo Grounds; Manhattan, NY
*		at Staten Island	L 2–4	1–1–0	St. Paul's Field; Staten Island, NY
*		at Pratt	W 1–0	2–1–0	Fort Greene Park; Brooklyn, NY
*		Staten Island	L 2–4	2–2–0	Polo Grounds; Manhattan, NY
*		at Boys Club	W 3–0	3–2–0	Unknown; Unknown
*		at Springfield	T 1–1	3–2–1	Pratt Field; Springfield, MA
*		Boys Club	W 6–0	4–2–1	Polo Grounds; Manhattan, NY
*		Pratt	W 4–1	5–2–1	Polo Grounds; Manhattan, NY
*		Cameron	W 2–1	6–2–1	Polo Grounds; Manhattan, NY
*		Boys Club	T 0–0	6–2–2	Polo Grounds; Manhattan, NY
ISFL
March 12, 1910*		Haverford	W 3–1	7–2–2 (1–0–0)	Polo Grounds; Manhattan, NY
*		at Harvard	W 2–0	8–2–2 (2–0–0)	Harvard Stadium; Cambridge, MA
*		at Penn	W 2–0	9–2–2 (3–0–0)	Franklin Field; Philadelphia, PA
*		at Cornell	W 8–0	10–2–2 (4–0–0)	Percy Field; Ithaca, NY
*		Yale	T 0–0	10–2–3 (4–0–1)	Polo Grounds; Manhattan, NY
*Non-conference game. ^{#}Rankings from United Soccer Coaches. (#) Tournament seedings in parentheses.
