= 1942 Princeton Tigers men's soccer team =

US collegiate soccer team

1942 Princeton Tigers men's soccer

National co-champions
- Conference: Independent
- Record: 8–1–0

The 1942 Princeton Tigers men's soccer team represented Princeton University during the 1942 ISFA season. The Tigers finished with an 8–0–1 record and were considered ISFA co-champions along with RPI, Springfield, and UMass, a title claim recognized by the American Soccer History Archives. It was the 74th season of a soccer club represented by the university playing, and the 37th season being a varsity team.

== Schedule ==
| Date Time, TV | Rank^{#} | Opponent^{#} | Result | Record | Site City, State |
Regular season
| 1942* | | at Army | W 2–0 | 1–0–0 | Michie Stadium; West Point, NY |
| 1942* | | Cornell | W 6–0 | 2–0–0 | Palmer Stadium; Princeton, NJ |
| 1942* | | at Penn | W 5–2 | 3–0–0 | Franklin Field; Philadelphia, PA |
| 1942* | | Lafayette | W 6–0 | 4–0–0 | Palmer Stadium; Princeton, NJ |
| 1942* | | at Swarthmore | W 7–0 | 5–0–0 | Swarthmore, PA |
| October 31*; 12:00 p.m. | | at Harvard | W 3–0 | 6–0–0 | Harvard Stadium; Cambridge, MA |
| 1942* | | Harvard | W 3–0 | 7–0–0 | Palmer Stadium; Princeton, NJ |
| 1942* | | Lehigh | W 9–0 | 8–0–0 | Palmer Stadium; Princeton, NJ |
| 1942* | | at Yale | T 0–0 | 8–0–1 | Yale Bowl; New Haven, CT |
*Non-conference game. ^{#}Rankings from United Soccer Coaches. (#) Tournament seedings in parentheses.
