= 1940 Princeton Tigers men's soccer team =

US collegiate soccer team

1940 Princeton Tigers men's soccer

National co-champions
- Conference: Independent
- Record: 8–1–0

The 1940 Princeton Tigers men's soccer team represented Princeton University during the 1940 ISFA season. The Tigers finished with an 8–0–1 record and were considered ISFA co-champions along with Penn State. It was the 72nd season of a soccer club represented by the university playing.

== Schedule ==
Date Time, TV	Rank^{#}	Opponent^{#}	Result	Record	Site City, State
Regular season
1940*		at Army	W 2–1	1–0–0	Michie Stadium; West Point, NY
1940*		Cornell	W 4–1	2–0–0	Palmer Stadium; Princeton, NJ
1940*		Haverford	W 3–1	3–0–0	Palmer Stadium; Princeton, NJ
1940*		Lafayette	W 7–1	4–0–0	Palmer Stadium; Princeton, NJ
1940*		at Lehigh	W 6–0	5–0–0	Taylor Stadium; Bethlehem, PA
1940*		at Swarthmore	W 2–0	6–0–0	unknown Swarthmore, PA
1940*		at Harvard	W 5–0	7–0–0	Harvard Stadium; Cambridge, MA
1940*		at Penn	W 2–1	8–0–0	Franklin Field; Philadelphia, PA
1940*		Yale	T 1–1	8–0–1	Yale Bowl; New Haven, CT
*Non-conference game. ^{#}Rankings from United Soccer Coaches. (#) Tournament seedings in parentheses.
