= 1906 Harvard Crimson men's soccer team =

American college soccer season

1906 Harvard Crimson men's soccer
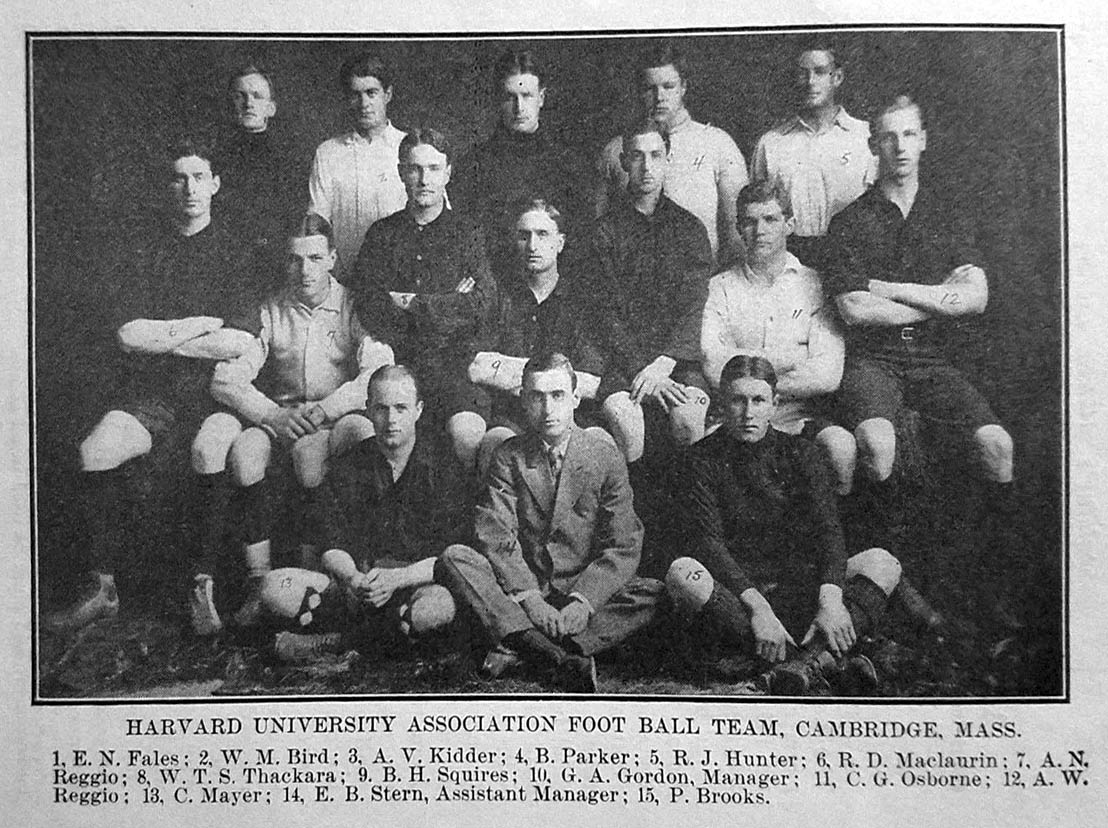

ISFA championship, (not champion)
- Conference: Independent
- Record: 3–1–0
- Head coach: (no coach) (Note: Teams were coached by captains.)
- Home stadium: Harvard Stadium

Uniform
Home

The 1906 Harvard Crimson men's soccer team represented Harvard University during the 1906 ISFA season. It was the second season of a Harvard soccer squad.

In the ISFA national championship where Haverford crowned national champions, Harvard finished with an 3–1–0 record. (Note: The Crimson official website only counts two matches, without indicating whether they were friendly or official games.)

The ISFA/ISFL national championship was the predecessor national soccer championship to the NCAA Division I men's soccer championship.

== Schedule ==
Date Time, TV	Rank^{#}	Opponent^{#}	Result	Record	Site City, State
(unknown) (Note: The sources do not specify whether they were friendly or official games. At least, they are not included into the games summarised at Columbia Spectator newspaper.)
15 Mar 1906*		Fort Warren	W 4–0	– (Note: Record unknown due to lack of/incomplete information about the matches.)	Harvard Stadium; Boston, MA
22 Mar 1906*		Penn	L 0–1	–	Harvard Stadium; Boston, MA
n/a		Columbia	L 0–2	–	n/a
ISFA Championship
n/a		Cornell	W n/a	1–0–0	n/a
n/a		Penn	W n/a	2–0–0	n/a
1 Dec 1906		Columbia	W 1–0	3–0–0	Cosmopolitan Park; Newark, NJ
8 Dec 1906		Haverford	L 1–2	3–1–0	Harvard Stadium; Boston, MA
*Non-conference game. ^{#}Rankings from United Soccer Coaches. (#) Tournament seedings in parentheses.
