= 1907–08 Haverford Fords men's soccer team =

American college soccer season

1907–08 Haverford Fords men's soccer
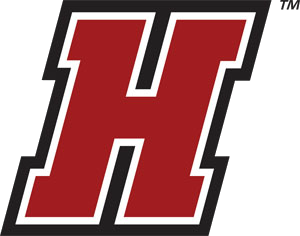

ISFA National co-champions
- Conference: Intercollegiate Soccer Football Association
- Record: 8–5–2 (4–1–0 ISFA)
- Head coach: Wilfred P. Mustard (7th season)
- Home stadium: Walton Field

1907–08 ISFL standings
	Conf.					Overall
Team	W		L		T	W		L		T
Haverford ‡	4	–	1	–	0	8	–	5	–	2
Yale ‡	4	–	1	–	0	4	–	1	–	0
Columbia	3	–	2	–	0	10	–	5	–	1
Harvard	2	–	3	–	0	2	–	6	–	2
Penn	2	–	3	–	0	2	–	3	–	1
Cornell	0	–	5	–	0	0	–	5	–	1
‡-National champion

The 1907–08 Haverford Fords men's soccer team represented Haverford College during the 1907–08 ISFL season, and the 1907–08 ACCL season. It was the Fords seventh season of existence. The Fords entered the season as the three-time defending ISFA National Champions and successfully defended their title, sharing the national championship with Yale.

== Schedule ==
Date Time, TV	Rank^{#}	Opponent^{#}	Result	Record	Site City, State
ACCL season
11-09-1907*		at Merion CC	L 0–5	0–1–0	MCC Field; Haverford, PA
11-30-1907*		Germantown	T 3–3	0–1–1	Walton Field; Haverford, PA
12-07-1907*		Frankford CC	W 1–0	1–1–1	FCC Grounds; Philadelphia, PA
12-21-1907		Penn	T 3–3	1–1–2	Walton Field; Haverford, PA
01-11-1908*		Philadelphia CC	W 2–1	2–1–2	Walton Field; Haverford, PA
01-18-1908*		at Germantown	L 1–2	2–2–2	Germantown Soccer Field; Philadelphia, PA
02-01-1908*		Belmont CC	L 0–1	2–3–2	Walton Field; Haverford, PA
02-22-1908*		at Philadelphia & Reading AA	L 0–2	2–4–2	unknown Philadelphia, PA
02-29-1908*		at Philadelphia CC	W 3–1	3–4–2	PCC Grounds; Flourtown, PA
03-01-1908*		unknown opponent	W 1–0	4–4–2	Walton Field; Haverford, PA
ISFA season
03-13-1908		Columbia	W 3–0	5–4–2 (1–0–0)	Walton Field; Haverford, PA
03-14-1908		Penn	W 2–0	6–4–2 (2–0–0)	Walton Field; Haverford, PA
03-20-1908		at Cornell	W 4–1	7–4–2 (3–0–0)	Cornell Field; Ithaca, NY
03-21-1908		at Yale	L 1–2	7–5–2 (3–1–0)	Yale Field; New Haven, CT
03-21-1908		vs. Harvard	W 1–0	8–5–2 (4–1–0)	Yale Field; New Haven, CT
*Non-conference game. ^{#}Rankings from United Soccer Coaches. (#) Tournament seedings in parentheses.

== Statistics ==
=== Top goalscorers ===
No.	Player	Goals
1	Thomas Lewis	7
2	Harold Furness	6
3	Walt Shoemaker	2
3	Earl Cadbury	2
3	George Strode	2
6	Cecil Drinker	1
6	Joseph Bushnell III	1
6	Carey Thoma	1
6	Carroll Brown	1
6	unknown goalscorer	1
