= 1910–11 Haverford Fords men's soccer team =

American college soccer season

1910–11 Haverford Fords men's soccer
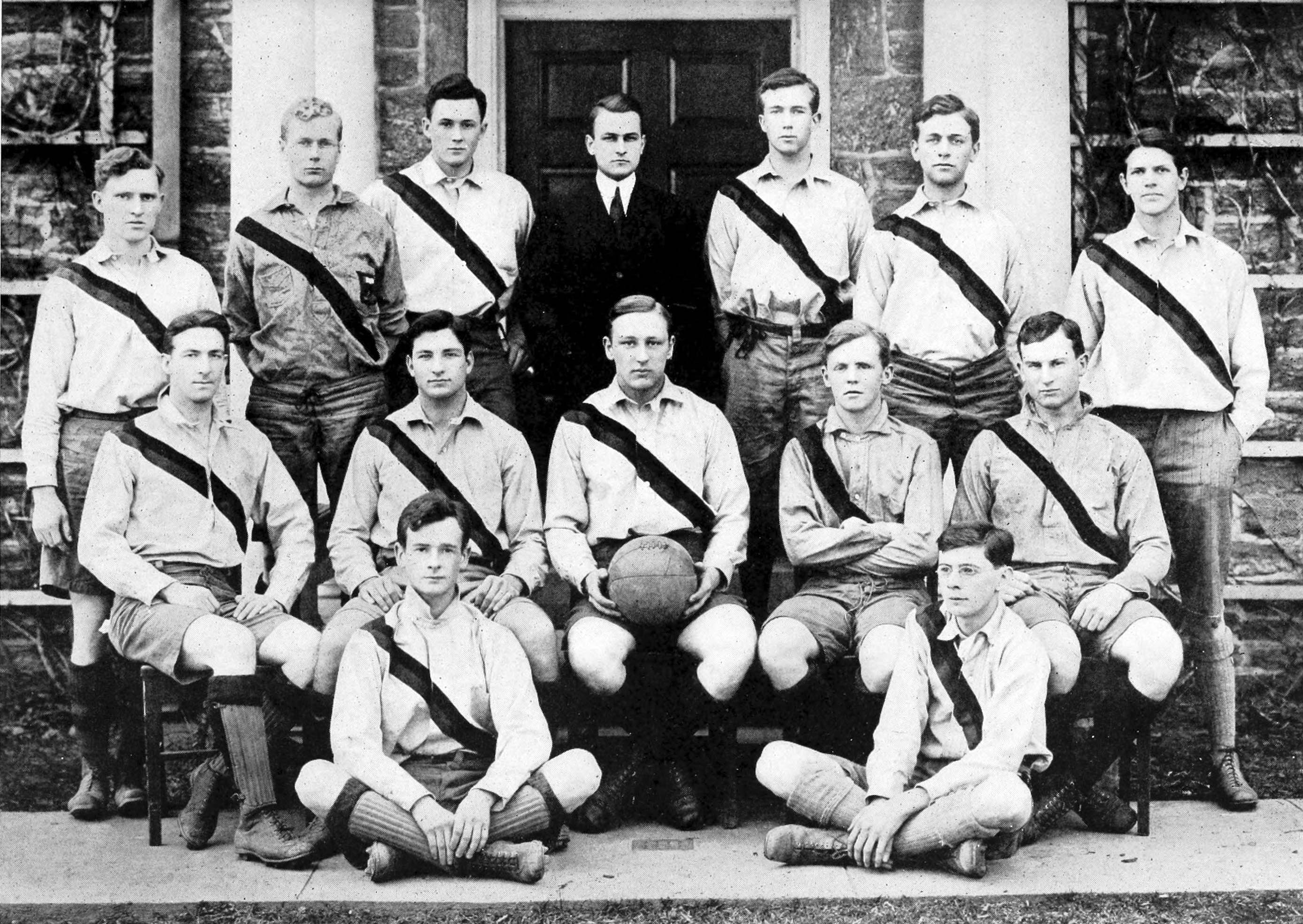

ISFA National Champions
- Conference: Intercollegiate Soccer Football Association
- Record: 9–5–4 (3–1–1 ISFA)
- Head coach: Frank Huish (1st season)
- Captain: Wilmer Young
- Home stadium: Walton Field

Uniform
Home

The 1910–11 Haverford Fords men's soccer team represented Haverford College during the 1910–11 ISFL season. It was the Fords 10th season of existence.

The Fords won the IAFL national championship this season, making it their sixth ISFA/ISFL national championship, the predecessor national soccer championship to the NCAA Division I Men's Soccer Championship. Including pre-regulation titles, it was the Fords' seventh national title.

== Schedule ==
Date Time, TV	Rank^{#}	Opponent^{#}	Result	Record	Site City, State
Non-conference regular season
11-26-1910*		Philadelphia Electric	W 4–0	1–0–0	Walton Field; Haverford, PA
12-03-1910*		at Princeton	W 3–1	2–0–0	Osborne Field; Princeton, NJ
12-10-1910*		West Philadelphia	L 2–3	2–1–0	Walton Field; Haverford, PA
12-17-1910*		Victor Boys	T 1–1	2–1–1	Walton Field; Haverford, PA
01-07-1911*		Belmont CC	L 2–3	2–2–1	Walton Field; Haverford, PA
01-14-1911*		at Moorestown	W 1–0	3–2–1	Moorestown Memorial Field; Moorestown, NJ
01-21-1911*		Penn	T 1–1	3–2–2	Walton Field; Haverford, PA
01-28-1911*		Holmesburg	T 2–2	3–2–3	Walton Field; Haverford, PA
02-04-1911*		Belmont-Merion	W 2–1	4–2–3	Walton Field; Haverford, PA
02-18-1911*		West Philadelphia	L 1–2	4–3–3	Walton Field; Haverford, PA
02-22-1911*		Belmont-Merion	L 1–2	4–4–3	Walton Field; Haverford, PA
02-25-1911*		Merion CC	W 3–1	5–4–3	Walton Field; Haverford, PA
IAFL
03-04-1911		Penn	W 3–1	6–4–3 (1–0–0)	Walton Field; Haverford, PA
03-11-1911		at Columbia	L 0–1	6–5–3 (1–1–0)	Polo Grounds; New York, NY
03-18-1911		at Harvard	W 4–0	7–5–3 (2–1–0)	Cambridge Common; Cambridge, MA
03-25-1911*		Moorestown-Merion	W 1–0	8–5–3	Walton Field; Haverford, PA
03-31-1911		Yale	T 2–2	8–5–4 (2–1–1)	Walton Field; Haverford, PA
04-08-1911		Cornell	W 2–1	9–5–4 (3–1–1)	Walton Field; Haverford, PA
*Non-conference game. ^{#}Rankings from United Soccer Coaches. (#) Tournament seedings in parentheses.

== Honors ==
=== IAFL All-Americans ===
- Wilmer Young, MF
