= 1915 Haverford Fords men's soccer team =

American college soccer season

1915 Haverford Fords men's soccer
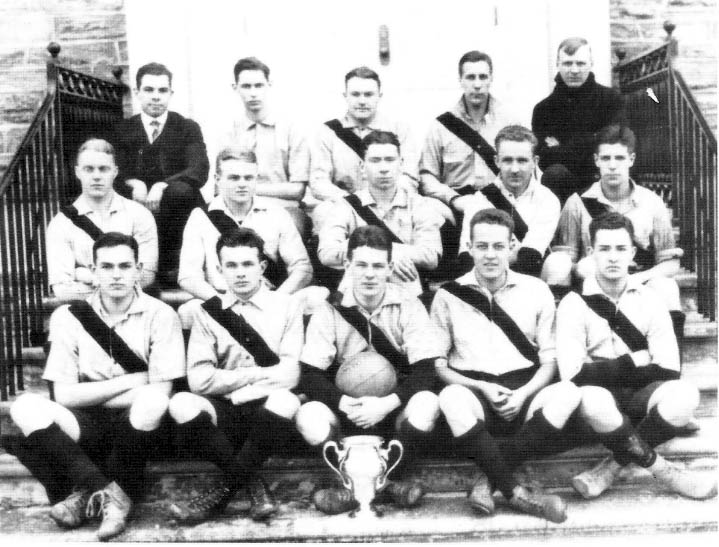

ISFA, National champions
- Conference: Philadelphia Cricket Clubs League
- Record: 7–3–3 ( PCCL)
- Head coach: Wilfred P. Mustard (4th season)
- Home stadium: Walton Field

Uniform
Home

The 1915 Haverford Fords men's soccer team represented Haverford College during the 1915 ISFL season. It was the program's 15th season of existence. The season began on October 16, 1915 and concluded on January 22, 1916, with ISFL league matches occurring in November and December.

Haverford won their first ISFA national title since 1911, and their sixth overall national college soccer title. Freshman striker, John Crosman, led the Fords with 10 goals across 13 matches.

== Schedule ==
Date Time, TV	Rank^{#}	Opponent^{#}	Result	Record	Site City, State
Philadelphia Cricket Clubs League
Oct. 16, 1915		Hibernian	L 2–3	0–1–0 (0–1–0)	Walton Field; Haverford, PA
Oct. 23, 1915		at Vincome A.C.	W 2–1	1–1–0 (1–1–0)	Vincome Field; Philadelphia, PA
Oct. 30, 1915		Kensington C.C.	W 4–0	2–1–0 (2–1–0)	Walton Field; Haverford, PA
Nov. 2, 1915		at Merion	W 4–0	3–1–0 (3–1–0)	Merion Clubhouse Field; Haverford, PA
ISFA season
Nov. 17, 1915		at Cornell	T 1–1	3–1–1 (0–0–1)	Schoellkopf Field; Ithaca, NY
Nov. 23, 1915		at Princeton	W 4–1	4–1–1 (1–0–1)	Palmer Stadium; Princeton, NJ
Dec. 1, 1915		Columbia	W 3–0	5–1–1 (2–0–1)	Walton Field; Haverford, PA
Dec. 6, 1915		Harvard	W 2–1	6–1–1 (3–0–1)	Walton Field; Haverford, PA
Dec. 11, 1915		at Yale	W 2–1	7–1–1 (4–0–1)	Yale Bowl; New Haven, CT
Dec. 18, 1915		Penn	T 1–1	7–1–2 (4–0–2)	Walton Field; Haverford, PA
Other matches
Dec. 21, 1915*		Penn State	L 2–5	7–2–2	Walton Field; Haverford, PA
Jan. 8, 1916*		Germantown	T 1–1	7–2–3	Walton Field; Haverford, PA
Jan. 22, 1916*		Moorestown; The Manheim Prize Championship	L 2–4	7–3–3	Walton Field; Haverford, PA
