= 1906–07 Haverford Fords men's soccer team =

American college soccer season

1906–07 Haverford Fords men's soccer
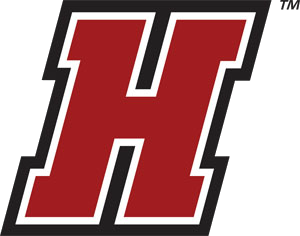

ISFA, National champions
- Conference: Philadelphia Cricket Clubs League
- Record: 5–7–2 (2–5–1 PCCL)
- Head coach: Wilfred P. Mustard (6th season)
- Home stadium: Walton Field

The 1906–07 Haverford Fords men's soccer team represented Haverford College during the 1906–07 IAFL season and the 1906–07 ACCL season. It was the Fords' sixth season of existence. The Fords entered the season as the two-time defending ISFA National Champions and successfully defended their title.

Despite a losing record across all matches, Haverford accumulated a 3–0–1 record in the ISFA matches, which guaranteed the Fords their national title as they had the best record amongst collegiate programs. Much of their losses came against local senior sides and professional cricket clubs that fielded soccer teams.

== Schedule ==
Date Time, TV	Rank^{#}	Opponent^{#}	Result	Record	Site City, State
Philadelphia Cricket Clubs League
1 Nov 1906		at Merion CC	L 2–3	0–1–0 (0–1–0)	Merion CC Field; Haverford, PA
6 Nov 1906		Belmont CC	L 0–4	0–2–0 (0–2–0)	Walton Field; Haverford, PA
29 Nov 1906		at Germantown	L 1–4	0–3–0 (0–3–0)	Germantown Soccer Field; Germantown, PA
15 Dec 1906		Merion CC	L 3–4	0–4–0 (0–4–0)	Walton Field; Haverford, PA
19 Jan 1907		Philadelphia CC	W 10–0	1–4–0 (1–4–0)	Walton Field; Haverford, PA
2 Feb 1907		at Philadelphia & Reading AA	L 1–6	1–5–0 (1–5–0)	PRAA Field; Philadelphia, PA
19 Feb 1907		Belmont CC	W 5–0	2–5–0 (2–5–0)	Walton Field; Haverford, PA
n/a		at Penn (Note: Penn participated in both, PCCL and ISFA.)	T n/a	2–5–1 (2–5–1)	n/a
ISFA Championship
20 Oct 1906		at Cornell	W 2–1	3–5–1 (1–0–0)	Walton Field; Haverford, PA
8 Dec 1906		at Harvard	W 2–1	4–5–1 (2–0–0)	Cambridge Common; Cambridge, MA
12-12-1906		at Penn	T 0–0	4–5–2 (2–0–1)	Franklin Field; Philadelphia, PA
12-18-1906		Columbia	W 3–0	5–5–2 (3–0–1)	Walton Field; Haverford, PA
Other matches
20 Oct 1906*		at Boys Club of New York	L 0–5	5–6–2	Walton Field; Haverford, PA
19 Feb 1907*		Mount Washington AC	L 0–1	5–7–2	Walton Field; Haverford, PA
*Non-conference game. ^{#}Rankings from United Soccer Coaches. (#) Tournament seedings in parentheses.
