= 1907–08 Yale Bulldogs men's soccer team =

American college soccer season

1907–08 Yale Bulldogs men's soccer

ISFA National co-champions
- Conference: Intercollegiate Soccer Football Association
- Record: 4–1–0 (4–1–0 ISFA)
- Head coach: No coach
- Home stadium: Yale Field

1907–08 ISFL standings
	Conf.					Overall
Team	W		L		T	W		L		T
Haverford ‡	4	–	1	–	0	8	–	5	–	2
Yale ‡	4	–	1	–	0	4	–	1	–	0
Columbia	3	–	2	–	0	10	–	5	–	1
Harvard	2	–	3	–	0	2	–	6	–	2
Penn	2	–	3	–	0	2	–	3	–	1
Cornell	0	–	5	–	0	0	–	5	–	1
‡-National champion

The 1907–08 Yale Bulldogs men's soccer team was the program's second season of existence and their second playing in the Intercollegiate Soccer Football League (ISFL).

The 1907–08 Yale team along with the Haverford Fords men's soccer program were both declared by the ISFL as co-national champions, making it Yale's first ever men's varsity soccer national championship.

== Schedule ==
Date Time, TV	Rank^{#}	Opponent^{#}	Result	Record	Site City, State
Regular season
1908		Cornell	W Unknown	2–1–0 (2–1–0)	Yale Field; New Haven, CT
03-21-1908		Haverford	W 2–1	3–1–0 (3–1–0)	Yale Field; New Haven, CT
04-11-1908		Harvard; Rivalry	W 1–0	4–1–0 (4–1–0)	Harvard Stadium; Cambridge, MA
