= 1911–12 Yale Bulldogs men's soccer team =

American college soccer season

1911–12 Yale Bulldogs men's soccer

ISFL National Champions
- Conference: Intercollegiate Soccer Football League
- Record: 5–0–0 (5–0–0 ISFL)
- Head coach: Alexander Timm (2nd season)
- Captain: Walter G. Dickey
- Home stadium: Yale Field

1912–13 ISFL standings
	Conf.					Overall
Team	W		L		T	W		L		T
Yale ‡	5	–	0	–	0	5	–	0	–	0
Haverford	4	–	1	–	0	12	–	3	–	3
Harvard	3	–	1	–	0	8	–	9	–	2
Columbia	2	–	2	–	1	5	–	6	–	1
Penn	2	–	2	–	1	8	–	9	–	3
Cornell	0	–	6	–	0	1	–	11	–	1
‡-National champion

The 1911–12 Yale Bulldogs men's soccer team was the program's sixth season of existence and their sixth playing in the Intercollegiate Soccer Football League (ISFL).

The season saw Yale go 5-0-0 in all competitive fixtures, earning themselves the ISFL national championship, which predated the NCAA Championship as the national collegiate college soccer championship.

== Results ==
Date	Opponent	Score
	COLUMBIA	4-0
04/12	HARVARD	1-2
03/15	HAVERFORD	2-0
	CORNELL	3-2
	PENNSYLVANIA	2-0
