= 1905–06 Haverford Fords men's soccer team =

American college soccer season

1905–06 Haverford Fords men's soccer
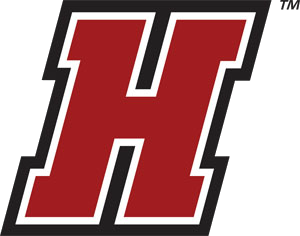

ISFA, National champions
- Conference: Philadelphia Cricket Clubs League
- Record: 5–6–1 (2–6–0 PCCL)
- Head coach: Wilfred P. Mustard (5th season)
- Home stadium: Walton Field

The 1905–06 Haverford Fords men's soccer team represented Haverford College during the 1905–06 IAFL season, and the 1905–06 ACCL season. It was the Fords fifth season of existence. The Fords entered the season as the defending ISFA National Champions and successfully defended their title.

Despite a losing record across all matches, Haverford accumulated a 3–0–1 record in the ISFA Tournament which guaranteed the Fords their national title.

== Departures ==
- Dickson, Aubrey
- Morris, Charles
- Morris, Harold
- Pearson, Henry
- Pearson, Ralph
- Priestman, A.G.
- Tatnall, A. G.

== Roster ==
The following players played on Haverford's roster during the 1905–06 season.

Note: Flags indicate national team as defined under FIFA eligibility rules; some limited exceptions apply. Players may hold more than one non-FIFA nationality.

No.	Pos.	Nation	Player
—		USA	Carroll Brown (Freshman)
—		USA	Paul Brown (Junior)
—		USA	Cecil Drinker (Freshman)
—		USA	Francis Godley (Freshman)
—		USA	Robert Lowry (Sophomore)
—		USA	Henry Pleasants, Jr. (Senior)
—		USA	David Philips (Freshman)

No.	Pos.	Nation	Player
—		USA	David Reid (Senior)
—		USA	William Rossmaessler (Junior)
—		USA	Raphael Shortlidge (Freshman)
—		USA	Reynold Spaeth (Sophomore)
—		USA	Sigmund Spaeth (Senior)
—		USA	Walter Young (Freshman)

== Results ==
Date Time, TV	Rank^{#}	Opponent^{#}	Result	Record	Site City, State
Philadelphia Cricket Clubs League
2 Dec 1905		at Germantown	L 1–3	0–1–0 (0–1–0)	Germantown Soccer Field; Germantown, PA
9 Mar 1905		Philadelphia & Reading AA	L 1–5	0–2–0 (0–2–0)	Walton Field; Haverford, PA
13 Jan 1906		Belmont CC	L 2–3	0–3–0 (0–3–0)	Walton Field; Haverford, PA
20 Jan 1906		Philadelphia & Reading AA	L 1–4	0–4–0 (0–4–0)	Walton Field; Haverford, PA
27 Jan 1906		Philadelphia CC	W 3–2	1–4–0 (1–4–0)	Walton Field; Haverford, PA
10 Feb 1906		Merion CC	L 0–2	1–5–0 (1–5–0)	Walton Field; Haverford, PA
22 Feb 1906		Germantown	W 6–2	2–5–0 (2–5–0)	Walton Field; Haverford, PA
24 Feb 1906		at Merion CC	L 1–2	2–6–0 (2–6–0)	MCC Pitch; Haverford, PA
ISFA matches
10 Mar 1906*		at Penn	W 2–1	3–6–0 (1–0–0)	Franklin Field; Philadelphia, PA
31 Mar 1906*		Harvard	W 1–0	4–6–0 (2–0–0)	Walton Field; Haverford, PA
6 Apr 1906*		at Columbia	T 1–1	4–6–1 (2–0–1)	Metropolitan Oval; New York City, NY
7 Apr 1906*		at Cornell	W 3–1	5–6–1 (3–0–1)	Cornell Field; Ithaca, NY
*Non-conference game. ^{#}Rankings from United Soccer Coaches. (#) Tournament seedings in parentheses.

== Statistics ==
=== Top goalscorers ===
Haverford junior, Sigmund Spaeth, lead the Fords with eight goals throughout the season.

Rank	Player	Class	Goals
1	Sigmund Spaeth	Junior	8
2	William Rossmaessler	Senior	5
3	Henry Pleasants	Junior	2
3	Smith	Junior	2
3	David Reid	Junior	2
6	Carroll Brown	Freshman	1
6	Harold Evans	Sophomore	1
6	Robert Lowry	Junior	1
