= 1918 Haverford Fords men's soccer team =

American college soccer season

1918 Haverford Fords men's soccer
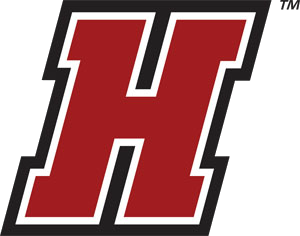

ISFA, National champions
- Conference: Philadelphia Cricket Clubs League
- Record: 8–1–1 (n/a PCCL)
- Head coach: George Young (4th season)
- Home stadium: Walton Field

The 1918 Haverford Fords men's soccer team represented Haverford College during the 1918 ISFL season. It was the program's 18th season of existence, and their fourth under head coach George Young.

The program won their eighth Intercollegiate Soccer Football League national title, and their first since 1915. Freshman Cornell Dowlin lead the Fords in scoring with six goals. Due to World War I, the Manheim Prize was not awarded.

== Roster ==
As of December 28, 1918

Note: Flags indicate national team as defined under FIFA eligibility rules; some limited exceptions apply. Players may hold more than one non-FIFA nationality.

No.	Pos.	Nation	Player
—	FW	USA	Cornell Dowlin
—	MF	USA	Elmer Thorpe
—	DF	USA	John Barlow

No.	Pos.	Nation	Player
—	MF	USA	Craige Snader
—	GK	USA	Chester Osler

== Schedule ==
Date Time, TV	Rank^{#}	Opponent^{#}	Result	Record	Site City, State
Regular season
1918*		Unknown	W 1–0	1–0–0	Unknown; Unknown
1918*		Unknown	W 1–0	2–0–0	Unknown; Unknown
October 26*		at Swarthmore	L 2–7	2–1–0	Swarthmore, PA
November 2*		at Germantown	W 3–1	3–1–0	Walton Field; Haverford, PA
November 9*		American Pulley	W 4–2	4–1–0	Walton Field; Haverford, PA
November 23*		at Westtown	W 1–0	5–1–0	Raiford Field; West Chester, PA
December 7*		at Germantown	T 1–1	5–1–1	Germantown Green; Philadelphia, PA
December 14*		Unknown	W 1–0	6–1–1	Unknown; Unknown
December 21*		Unknown	W 1–0	7–1–1	Unknown; Unknown
December 28*		Unknown	W 1–0	8–1–1	Unknown; Unknown
*Non-conference game. ^{#}Rankings from United Soccer Coaches. (#) Tournament seedings in parentheses. All times are in Eastern.
