= 1930 Harvard Crimson men's soccer team =

American college soccer season

1930 Harvard Crimson men's soccer

ISFA Co-National Champions
- Conference: Independent
- Record: 8–1–0
- Head coach: John F. Carr (2nd season)
- Assistant coach: John R. Bland (1st season)
- Home stadium: Harvard Stadium

The 1930 Harvard Crimson men's soccer team represented Harvard University during the 1930 ISFA season. It was the varsity program's 24th season of existence.

Harvard won their fourth ever national championship, and to date, their most recent national championship. Harvard accumulated a record of 8-1-0 through nine matches. The title was shared with Penn and Yale.

== Schedule ==
Date Time, TV	Rank^{#}	Opponent^{#}	Result	Record	Site City, State
Regular season
10-03-1930*		Wesleyan	W 3–1	1–0–0	Harvard Stadium; Boston, MA
10-11-1930*		Bridgewater State	W 4–0	2–0–0	Harvard Stadium; Boston, MA
10-18-1930*		Penn	W 6–1	3–0–0	Harvard Stadium; Boston, MA
10-24-1930*		Dartmouth	W 3–1	4–0–0	Harvard Stadium; Boston, MA
11-01-1930*		Navy	W 2–1	5–0–0	Harvard Stadium; Boston, MA
11-05-1930*		MIT	W 7–0	6–0–0	Harvard Stadium; Boston, MA
11-07-1930*		Tufts	W 6–0	7–0–0	Harvard Stadium; Boston, MA
11-15-1930*		at Brown	W 4–1	8–0–0	Brown University Field; Providence, RI
11-22-1930*		at Yale; Rivalry	L 0–1	8–1–0	Yale Bowl; New Haven, CT
*Non-conference game. ^{#}Rankings from United Soccer Coaches. (#) Tournament seedings in parentheses.
