= 1945 Haverford Fords men's soccer team =

American college soccer season

1945 Haverford Fords men's soccer
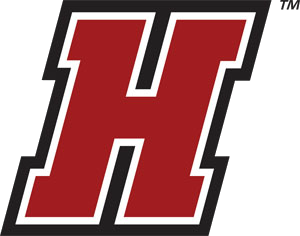

Co-National Champions (ASHA)

MASAC Champions MAISL Champions
- Conference: Middle Atlantic States Athletic Conference
- Record: 8–0–0 (6–0–0 MAC)
- Head coach: Ray Mullan (4th season)
- Captain: Arnold Post
- Home stadium: Walton Field

1945 MAISL soccer standings
	Conf.					Overall
Team	W		L		T	W		L		T
Haverford ‡	3	–	0	–	0	8	–	0	–	0
Penn	2	–	1	–	0	8	–	1	–	0
Princeton	1	–	2	–	0	3	–	3	–	1
Cornell	0	–	3	–	0	3	–	3	–	1
‡ – MAISL champion

The 1945 Haverford Fords men's soccer team represented Haverford College during the 1945 ISFL season. It was the Fords 46th season as a varsity program.

The Fords finished the 1945 with an undefeated 6-0 record, winning both the Middle Atlantic States Athletic Conference championship, and the Middle Atlantic Intercollegiate Soccer League championship. Due to World War II, there was no formal national champion declared by ISFA at this time, although the college, along with three other colleges (Army, Navy, and Yale) self-declared themselves as champions for the 1945 ISFA season. This has since been recognized by the American Soccer History Archives as a claimed national title. To date, this is the most recent year Haverford won a national soccer championship at any level.

Ev Jones lead the Fords in scoring, scoring 13 goals in the six matches played during the regular season.

== Background ==
The Fords finished the 1944 season with a record of 5-2-2. The program scored 29 goals over the course of the nine-match season, and allowed 29 goals. Junior Paul Domincovich led Haverford in goals during the 1944 ISFA season, scoring nine goals in nine matches. Redshirt sophomore, Bob Clayton was second on the team with five goals.

== Roster ==
As of December 28, 1945

Note: Flags indicate national team as defined under FIFA eligibility rules; some limited exceptions apply. Players may hold more than one non-FIFA nationality.

No.	Pos.	Nation	Player
—	MF	USA	Carlos Barazzo
—	FW	USA	Bob Clayton
—	FW	USA	Nathaniel Cooper
—	DF	USA	Tom Gerlach
—	MF	USA	Bill Harris
—	FW	USA	Ev Jones
—	DF	USA	Corson Jones

No.	Pos.	Nation	Player
—	GK	USA	Donald Kindler
—	FW	USA	Charlie Matlack
—	DF	USA	Dan Oliver
—	MF	USA	Arnold Post
—	DF	USA	James Reynolds
—	DF	USA	Joseph Sproule
—	MF	USA	Larry Steefel
—	MF	USA	Thomas Stern

== Schedule ==
#	Date	Opponent	Res.	Score	Location	Scorers
1	1945	Ursinus	W	2–1	Haverford, Pa.	Steefel, Jones
2	1945	Delaware	W	6–0	Haverford, Pa.	Jones (3), Matlack, Steefel, Clayton
3	1945	Lehigh	W	4–0	Haverford, Pa.	Jones (2), Harris, Cooper
4	1945	at Penn	W	4–3	Philadelphia, Pa.	Post, Jones, Clayton
5	1945	at Cornell	W	4–3	Ithaca, N.Y.	Clayton, Jones, Matlack (2)
6	1945	Princeton	W	2–1	Haverford, Pa.	Cooper, Matlack
7	1945	Swarthmore	W	4–1	Haverford, Pa.	Jones (2), Post (2)
8	1945	Johns Hopkins	W	6–0	Haverford, Pa.	Jones (3), Cooper, Matlack, Post

== Honors ==
=== ISFA All-Americans ===
- Bob Clayton, Defender
