= 1928 Yale Bulldogs men's soccer team =

American college soccer season

1928 Yale Bulldogs men's soccer

ISFA National Champions
- Conference: Ivy League
- Record: 7–0–2 (4–0–0 Ivy)
- Head coach: Walter Leeman (2nd season)
- Home stadium: Yale Bowl

The 1928 Yale Bulldogs men's soccer team represented Yale University during the 1928 ISFA season. It was the Bulldogs's 23rd season as a varsity program, and the second season of Walter Leeman at the helm. The Bulldogs won their first undisputed national title, winning the 1928 Collegiate title. This was Yale's fourth ever national championship for men's soccer.

== Known players ==
The entire roster for the 1928 team is unknown. John Whitelaw served as the team's captain during the 1928 season.

== Schedule ==
Date Time, TV	Rank^{#}	Opponent^{#}	Result	Record	Site City, State
Regular season
10-07-1928*		New Haven Thistles	W 6–0	1–0–0	Yale Bowl; New Haven, CT
10-13-1928		at Penn; Rivalry	W 4–1	2–0–0 (1–0–0)	Franklin Field; Philadelphia, PA
10-20-1928*		at Navy	W 4–0	3–0–0	Thompson Stadium; Annapolis, MD
10-26-1928*		Springfield	W 3–1	4–0–0	Yale Bowl; New Haven, CT
11-02-1928		Dartmouth; Rivalry	W 4–0	5–0–0 (2–0–0)	Yale Bowl; New Haven, CT
11-10-1928*		Waterbury	T 1–1	5–0–1	Yale Bowl; New Haven, CT
11-17-1928		at Princeton; Rivalry	W 2–1	6–0–1 (3–0–0)	Palmer Stadium; Princeton, NJ
11-24-1928		Harvard; Rivalry	W 2–1	7–0–1 (4–0–0)	Yale Bowl; New Haven, CT
11-29-1928*		Army	T 0–0	7–0–2	Yale Bowl; New Haven, CT
*Non-conference game. ^{#}Rankings from United Soccer Coaches. (#) Tournament seedings in parentheses.
