= 1917 Haverford Fords men's soccer team =

American college soccer season

1917 Haverford Fords men's soccer
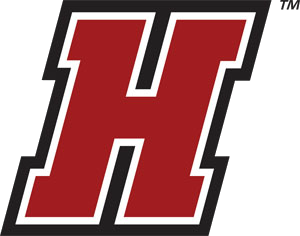

ISFA, National champions
- Conference: Philadelphia Cricket Clubs League
- Record: 11–2–1 (8-1-1 PCCL)
- Head coach: George Young (3rd season)
- Captain: Gardiner
- Home stadium: Walton Field

The 1917 Haverford Fords men's soccer team represented Haverford College during the 1917–18 ISFL season. It was the Fords' 16th season of existence. The team consolidated as the national soccer team in the country.

During a banquet held by the Haverford Alumni Committee in January 1917, it was announced that George Young had been re-engaged as coach of the team, starting his third year managing the soccer squad.

The Fords won the IAFL national championship this season, making it their 7th. ISFA/ISFL national championship, the predecessor national soccer championship to the NCAA Division I Men's Soccer Championship. Including pre-regulation titles, it was the Fords' sixth national title.

== Schedule ==
Date Time, TV	Rank^{#}	Opponent^{#}	Result	Record	Site City, State
ISFA championship
27 Oct 1917		Penn	W 4–1	1–0–0 (1–0–0)	Walton Field; Haverford, PA
10 Nov 1917		at Cornell	T 1–1	1–0–1 (1–0–1)	Walton Field; Haverford, PA
Philadelphia Cricket Clubs League
13 Oct 1917		at Moorestown	W 3–0	2–0–1 (1–0–0)	Moorestown, NJ
3 Nov 1917		Merion	W 3–1	3–0–1 (2–0–0)	Walton Field; Haverford, PA
17 Nov 1917		Philadelphia CC	W 5–0	4–0–1 (3–0–0)	Walton Field; Haverford, PA
21 Nov 1917		Penn	W 2–1	5–0–1 (4–0–0)	Walton Field; Haverford, PA
29 Nov 1917		at Merion CC	W 4–3	6–0–1 (5–0–0)	Walton Field; Haverford, PA
29 Nov 1917		Moorestown	W 5–2	7–0–1 (6–0–0)	Walton Field; Haverford, PA
15 Dec 1917		at Penn	L 1–2	7–1–1 (6–1–0)	Philadelphia, PA
22 Jan 2018		at Philadelphia CC	W 1–0	8–1–1 (7–1–0)	Chestnut Hill, PA
ACCL championship
16 Apr 2018*		Penn	W 2–1	9–1–1	Walton Field; Haverford, PA
ACCL Crescent Cup
13 Apr 2018*		Montclair A.C. (NY)	L 0–3	9–2–1	Walton Field; Haverford, PA
Non-conference matches
19 Oct 1917*		at Westtown	W 1–0	10–2–1	
16 Mar 2018*		Founders Club	W 3–2	11–2–1	Walton Field; Haverford, PA
*Non-conference game. ^{#}Rankings from United Soccer Coaches. (#) Tournament seedings in parentheses.

== Season summary ==
Pl	W	T	L	Gf.	Ga.
14	11	1	2	35	17
