= 1904–05 Haverford Fords men's soccer team =

American college soccer season

1904–05 Haverford Fords men's soccer
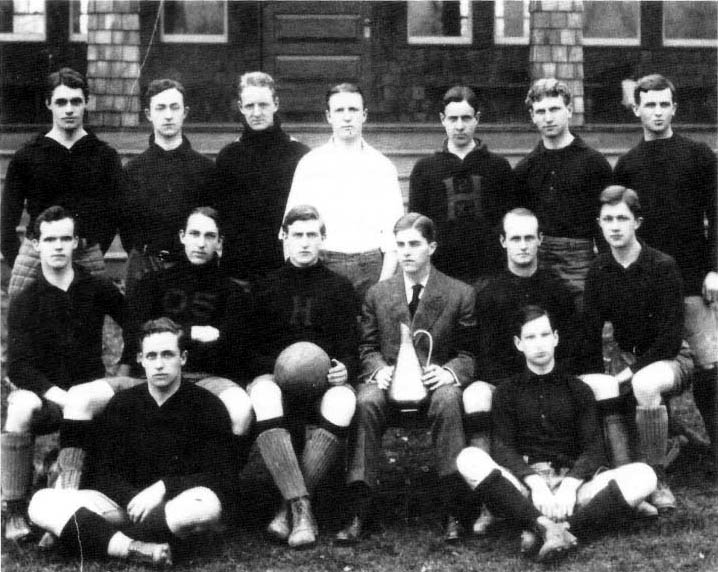

ISFA, national co-champions
- Conference: Philadelphia Cricket Clubs League
- Record: 6–1–3 (3–1–1 PCCL)
- Head coach: Wilfred P. Mustard (4th season)
- Home stadium: Walton Field

Uniform
Home

The 1904–05 Haverford Fords men's soccer team represented Haverford College during the 1904–05 IAFL season. It was the Fords fourth season of existence. The Fords competed in the IAFL as well as in the ACCL, and won both the IAFL National Championship, the predecessor to the NCAA Division I Men's Soccer Championship as well as The Manheim Prize, for winning the ACCL.

The Fords became the first team to win an Intercollegiate Soccer Football Association title, which is considered by American soccer historians to be the first formal national championship given to a college soccer program. Haverford finished with six wins, one defeat and three draws.

== Roster ==
The following players played on Haverford's roster during the 1904–05 season.

- Brown, Paul
- Dickson, Aubrey
- Lowry, Robert
- Morris, Charles
- Morris, Harold
- Pearson, Henry
- Pearson, Ralph
- Pleasants Jr., Henry
- Priestman, A.G.
- Reid, David
- Rossmaessler, William
- Spaeth, Reynold
- Spaeth, Sigmund
- Tatnall, A. G.

== Results ==
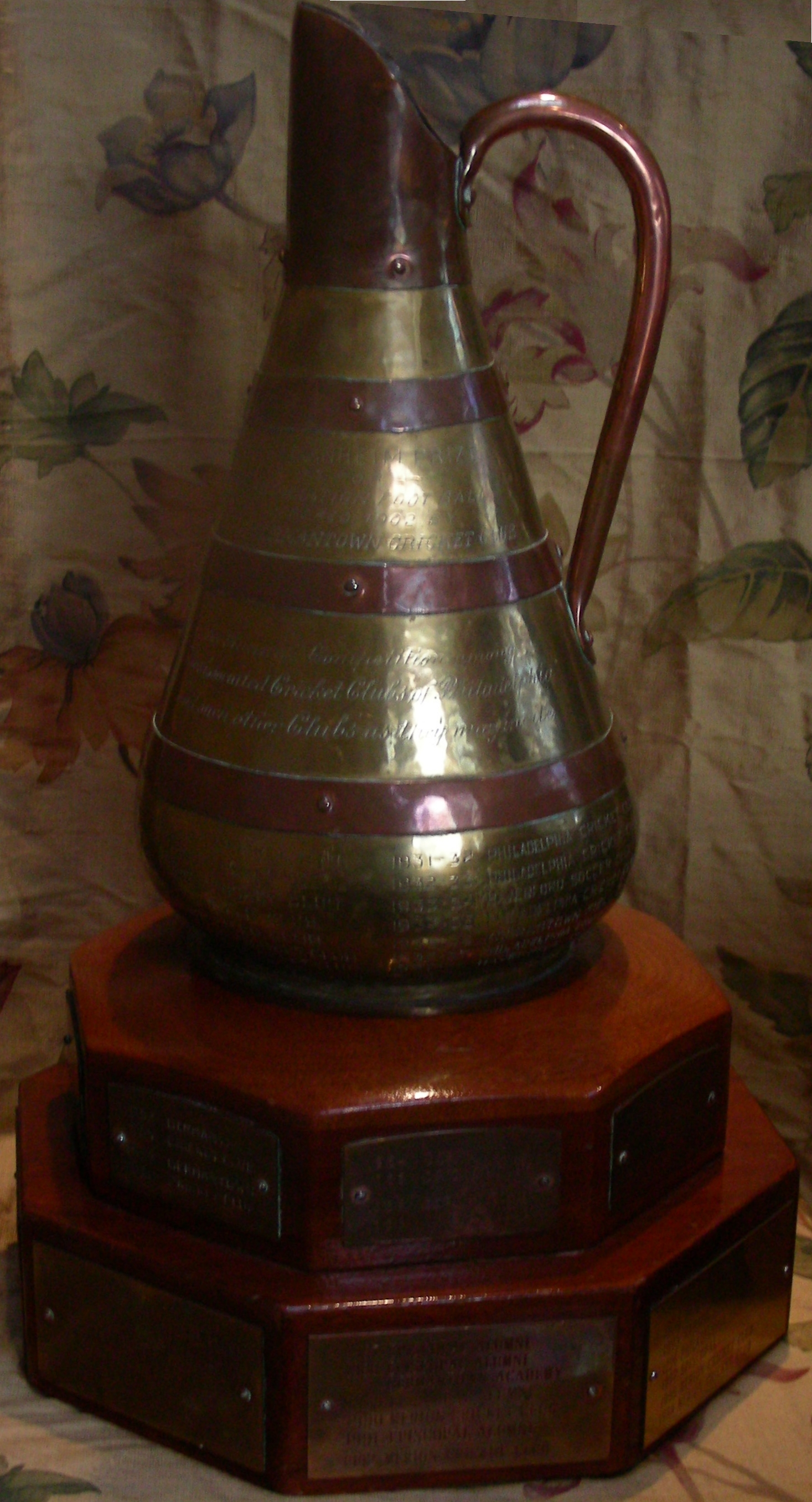
The Manheim Prize, trophy awarded by the Philadelphia Cricket Clubs League, won by Haverford

Date Time, TV	Rank^{#}	Opponent^{#}	Result	Record	Site City, State
Philadelphia Cricket Clubs League
3 Dec 1904		at Germantown	W 4–1	1–0–0 (1–0–0)	Germantown Soccer Field; Germantown, PA
12-31-1904		Germantown	T 1–1	1–0–1 (1–0–1)	Walton Field; Haverford, PA
28 Jan 1905		Merion CC	W 2–1	2–0–1 (2–0–1)	Walton Field; Haverford, PA
18 Feb 1905		at Merion CC	L 0–2	2–1–1 (2–1–1)	MCC Field; Haverford, PA
11 Mar 1905		Germantown	W 3–0	3–1–1 (3–1–1)	Walton Field; Haverford, PA
ISFA Championship Series
1 Apr 1905*		at Harvard; Game 1	W 1–0	4–1–1 (1–0–0)	Cambridge Common; Cambridge, MA
15 Apr 1905*		Harvard; Game 2	W 1–0	5–1–1 (2–0–0)	Walton Field; Haverford, PA
Other matches
14 Jan 1905*		at Staten Island CC	T 1–1	5–1–2	St. Paul's Field; Staten Island, NY
4 Feb 1905*		Philadelphia & Reading AA	W 4–1	6–1–2	PRAA Field; Philadelphia, PA
18 Mar 1905*		Staten Island CC	T 2–2	6–1–3	Walton Field; Haverford, PA
*Non-conference game. ^{#}Rankings from United Soccer Coaches. (#) Tournament seedings in parentheses.
