= Pennsylvania Intercollegiate Association Football League =

College sports conference, 1915–1925

The Penn Intercollegiate Association Football League was a pre-NCAA collegiate soccer conference for colleges across the Commonwealth of Pennsylvania that were not admitted at the time to the Intercollegiate Soccer Football League (ISFL), the top tier of college soccer in the United States prior to the NCAA sanctioning the sport.

The league began play in 1915 and disbanded in 1925 as it was absorbed by the ISFL.

== Members ==
- Drexel
- Lafayette
- Lehigh
- Haverford
- Penn JV
- Swarthmore
- Temple
- West Chester

== Champions ==
Season	Champion	Ref.
1915-16	Penn JV	
1916-17	Penn JV (2)	
1917-18	Penn JV (3)	
1918	Canceled due to World War I	
1919	Swarthmore	
1920	Swarthmore (2)	
1921	Swarthmore (3)	
1922	Lehigh	
1923	Penn JV (4)	
1924	Haverford	
1925	Swarthmore (4)	
