= 1901–02 Haverford Fords men's soccer team =

American college soccer season

1901–02 Haverford Fords men's soccer
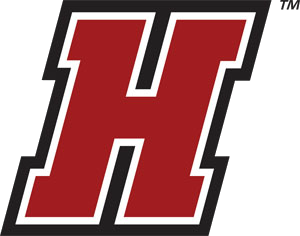

National co-champions (ASHA/IFRA)

ACCL champions
- Conference: Independent
- Record: 4–1–0
- Head coach: Unknown

The 1901–02 Haverford Fords men's soccer team represented Haverford College during the 1901–02 college soccer season. It was the Fords first season of existence. The Fords competed in ACCL and were deemed national co-champions by the American Soccer History Archives and the Intercollegiate Football Research Association. The Fords garnered a record of four wins, a loss and no draws.

== Schedule ==
Haverford participated in the "Philadelphia Cricket Clubs League", established in 1902 by cricket clubs due to increasing popularity of the sport among its members.

Results' source:

Date Time, TV	Rank^{#}	Opponent^{#}	Result	Record	Site City, State
Philadelphia Cricket Clubs League
01-04-1902*		Germantown	W 2–0	1–0–0	Walton Field; Haverford, PA
01-18-1902*		at Belmont CC	L 0–7	1–1–0	BCC Field; Philadelphia, PA
01-25-1902*		at Merion CC	W 2–1	2–1–0	Walton Field; Haverford, PA
02-08-1902*		at Merion CC	W 2–0	3–1–0	Walton Field; Haverford, PA
02-15-1902*		Belmont CC	W 1–0	4–1–0	Walton Field; Haverford, PA
