= Ann Koger =

American tennis coach

- Born: 1950 (age 75–76) Baltimore, Maryland, U.S.
- Turned pro: 1973
- Retired: 1977
- College: Morgan State

Ann Koger (born 1950) is an American former tennis player and coach. An African-American tennis pioneer, she was the coach of Haverford College's women's tennis team from 1981 to 2016.

== Life and career ==
Born in Baltimore in 1950, Koger took up tennis at age seven or eight. As a young player, she faced racial segregation on the courts of Druid Hill Park in Baltimore. She was the first African American to win the Maryland State Tennis Championships. In 1968, she won the American Tennis Association (ATA)'s National Women's Doubles Championship. In college, she was a multi-sport athlete, including a member of Morgan State's men's tennis team from 1969 to 1972. She was one of the first African Americans to play on the Virginia Slims Circuit (the precursor of the WTA Tour), where she played from 1973 to 1977.

Koger was hired to coach Haverford's women's tennis team in 1981. The program won multiple conference championships during her tenure. In 2016, she retired after 35 years in the position.
