= Harvard–Yale soccer rivalry =

Collegiate association football rivalry

Harvard-Yale soccer rivalry
- Harvard Crimson Yale Bulldogs
- Sport: College soccer
- First meeting: Men: May 25, 1907; Harvard 1–1 Yale; Women: November 11, 1977; Harvard 2–0 Yale
- Latest meeting: Men: October 11, 2025; Harvard 1–1 Yale; Women: October 12, 2025; Harvard 2–0 Yale
- Stadiums: Jordan Field (Harvard); Reese Stadium (Yale)

Statistics
- Total meetings: Men: 108; Women: 46
- All-time series: Men: Harvard 56–42–14; Women: Harvard 37–9–2
- Largest victory: Men: Harvard 6–1 Yale (1977); Women: Harvard 6–0 Yale (2022)
- Longest win streak: Men: 5, Harvard (1983–1988, 2006–2010); Women: 13, Harvard (1977–1989)
- Longest unbeaten streak: Men: 7, Harvard (1957–1963); Women: 13, Harvard (1977–1989)
- Current win streak: Men: 1, Harvard (2022–); Women: 4, Harvard (2018–)
- Current unbeaten streak: Men: 2, Harvard (2021–); Women: 4, Harvard (2018–)

The Harvard–Yale soccer rivalry is a rivalry between Harvard University and Yale University. The men's series has been played regularly since 1907, while the women's teams have played since 1977. For over fifty years, the annual Harvard–Yale soccer game was played as a "curtain raiser" to the schools' gridiron football game, known simply as The Game. In addition to its varsity soccer teams which compete in the Ivy League, the two schools' intramural soccer champions have regularly featured in the annual Harkness Cup games, named after Edward Harkness, a benefactor of both universities.

== History ==
The soccer rivalry between Harvard and Yale has been compared to the association football rivalry between Cambridge University and Oxford University.

=== Early years ===
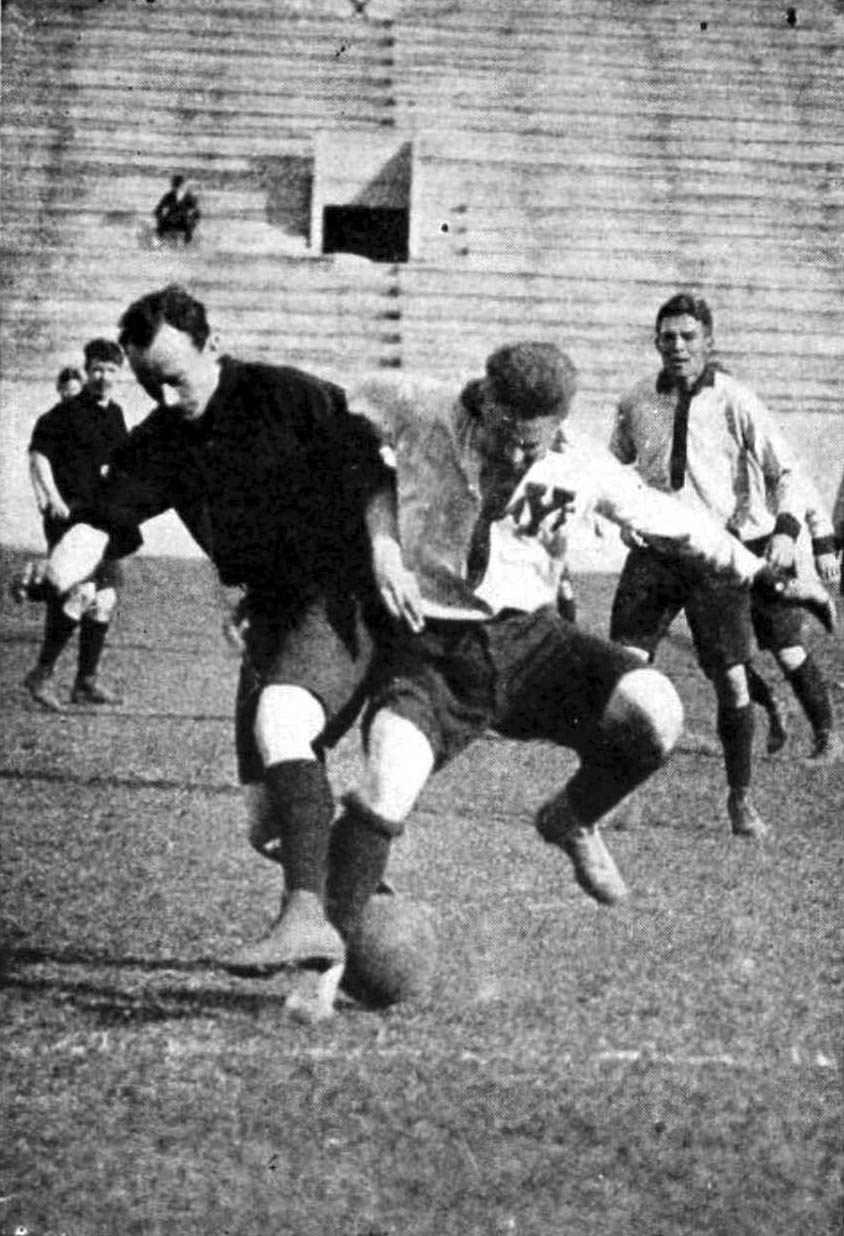
Yale (white shirts) vs Harvard game in 1922

The early history of the soccer rivalry between the men's sides dates back to the 1870s, and is intertwined with the evolution of gridiron football and rugby union as sports. The two schools finally played each other in 1875, after Yale, which had been following soccer rules, agreed to play according to the rugby-style rules adopted by Harvard, and lost, 4–0.

From 1906 to 1925, both Harvard and Yale participated in the Intercollegiate Soccer Football League (ISFL), which included several East Coast colleges that would later be part of the Ivy League. During that period, Yale and Harvard each won the ISFL championship twice, based on their win-loss records for those seasons. In 1926, the league became known as the Intercollegiate Soccer Football Association (ISFA). The ISFA declared Harvard, Yale, and University of Pennsylvania as joint champions for 1930, after each team finished the season undefeated, except for losing to each other, with Yale beating Harvard, 1–0.

=== Annual sports weekend ===
Through the 1980s, the Harvard–Yale men's soccer game was "a big part of the schools' traditional sports weekend" in November. In 1931, the annual Harvard–Yale soccer day took place on the Harvard Business School Field, with matches between their varsity, junior varsity, and freshman teams. Starting in 1935, intramural teams at Harvard and Yale began playing each other on the Friday before the main varsity gridiron football game, as part of the annual Harkness Cup competition, a series that was "uncommon if not unheard of elsewhere", according to an article in The New York Times.

In 1960, The Boston Globe suggested that the Harvard–Yale soccer game might be a bigger draw than the annual freshman football game for the first time, due to the popularity of Christian Ohiri, a Nigerian international who played for Harvard. In 1962, Sports Illustrated reported that the largest crowds on the Friday before The Harvard–Yale Game were at the soccer game and at the freshman football game, with approximately 3,500 people attending each.

In 1965, Yale defeated Harvard 6–3 in its first win against Harvard in soccer since 1956; they had tied in 1960. Future United States senator John Kerry, then a Yale senior, scored a hat-trick, which he has referred to as his greatest achievement as an athlete.

In 1985, The New York Times reported that although Harvard won the annual varsity soccer game, 4–1, Yale won the junior varsity soccer game, as well as the Edward S. Harkness Cup for winning all four matches between the two schools' intramural champions in men's soccer, women's soccer, tackle football, and touch football. It was the 27th time that Yale had won the Harkness Cup in the history of the series; Harvard had won 15 times, and the schools had split the trophy five times.

=== From the 1990s to present ===
In the 1990s, the Harvard and Yale men's soccer teams' seasons ended earlier than the gridiron football teams' seasons, contributing to the decline in fanfare surrounding The Game. While a 2000 article in The Harvard Crimson acknowledged that the women's soccer rivalry between the two schools "isn't as intense as the football version", the same newspaper reported in 2013 that coaches for both the Bulldogs and the Crimson agreed that the annual game between the two rivals' men's soccer teams "brings a special excitement beyond just a regular conference game." In 2011, the Yale Daily News noted that the Jonathan Edwards College men's soccer team was representing Yale in the Harkness Cup series for the second consecutive year after defeating Harvard's Kirkland House on penalty kicks in 2010.

In 2019, The Harvard Independent reported that "The Harvard women have proved themselves to hold power over the Yale soccer program, losing only once to the Bulldogs over the past 12 years." At the time, the Harvard women's varsity team had a 32–9–2 record against Yale; the men's team was at 55–39–12.

As of 2023, the Harvard and Yale varsity men's soccer teams have met 109 times, while the women's sides have played 46 times.

== Men's results ==
Harvard victories	Yale victories	Tie games

No.	Date	Location	Winner	Score
1	May 25, 1907	Cambridge, MA	Tie	1–1
2	April 11, 1908	Cambridge, MA	Yale	1–0
3	March 20, 1909	New Haven, CT	Tie	3–3
4	April 12, 1910	Cambridge, MA	Harvard	3–0
5	April 11, 1911	New Haven, CT	Harvard	3–1
6	March 27, 1912	Cambridge, MA	Yale	4–0
7	April 12, 1913	New Haven, CT	Harvard	2–1
8	September 8, 1914	New Haven, CT	Harvard	3–1
9	November 9, 1915	Cambridge, MA	Yale	2–1
10	November 8, 1921	Cambridge, MA	Harvard	3–0
11	November 25, 1922	New Haven, CT	Yale	1–0
12	November 23, 1923	Cambridge, MA	Yale	4–2
13	November 21, 1924	New Haven, CT	Harvard	2–1
14	November 21, 1925	Cambridge, MA	Tie	2–2
15	November 20, 1926	New Haven, CT	Harvard	3–2
16	November 18, 1927	Cambridge, MA	Yale	3–1
17	November 24, 1928	New Haven, CT	Yale	2–1
18	November 23, 1929	Cambridge, MA	Harvard	2–1
19	November 22, 1930	New Haven, CT	Yale	1–0
20	November 21, 1931	Cambridge, MA	Tie	1–1
21	November 19, 1932	New Haven, CT	Yale	2–0
22	November 24, 1932	Cambridge, MA	Tie	2–2
23	November 21, 1933	Cambridge, MA	Harvard	3–1
24	November 23, 1934	New Haven, CT	Harvard	1–0
25	November 22, 1935	Cambridge, MA	Yale	2–1
26	November 20, 1936	New Haven, CT	Yale	3–0
27	November 19, 1937	Cambridge, MA	Harvard	2–1
28	November 18, 1938	New Haven, CT	Yale	2–1
29	November 24, 1939	Cambridge, MA	Harvard	2–1

No.	Date	Location	Winner	Score
30	November 22, 1940	New Haven, CT	Yale	2–0
31	November 21, 1941	Cambridge, MA	Yale	2–1
32	November 20, 1942	New Haven, CT	Yale	2–0
33	November 22, 1946	Cambridge, MA	Yale	3–2
34	November 21, 1947	New Haven, CT	Yale	2–1
35	November 19, 1948	Cambridge, MA	Harvard	3–0
36	November 18, 1949	New Haven, CT	Harvard	2–0
37	November 24, 1950	Cambridge, MA	Yale	3–0
38	November 23, 1951	New Haven, CT	Yale	1–0
39	November 21, 1952	Cambridge, MA	Harvard	3–2
40	November 20, 1953	New Haven, CT	Yale	3–0
41	November 19, 1954	Cambridge, MA	Yale	1–0
42	November 18, 1955	New Haven, CT	Harvard	2–1
43	November 23, 1956	Cambridge, MA	Yale	2–1
44	November 22, 1957	New Haven, CT	Harvard	4–2
45	November 21, 1958	Cambridge, MA	Harvard	1–0
46	November 20, 1959	New Haven, CT	Harvard	1–0
47	November 18, 1960	Cambridge, MA	Tie	0–0
48	November 24, 1961	New Haven, CT	Harvard	4–2
49	November 23, 1962	Cambridge, MA	Harvard	3–1
50	November 22, 1963	New Haven, CT	Harvard	3–2
51	November 20, 1964	Cambridge, MA	Yale	3–2
52	November 19, 1965	New Haven, CT	Yale	6–3
53	November 18, 1966	Cambridge, MA	Harvard	4–1
54	November 24, 1967	New Haven, CT	Harvard	2–1
55	November 22, 1968	Cambridge, MA	Yale	3–1
56	November 21, 1969	New Haven, CT	Harvard	3–0
57	November 20, 1970	Cambridge, MA	Harvard	1–0
58	November 19, 1971	New Haven, CT	Harvard	2–1

No.	Date	Location	Winner	Score
59	November 22, 1972	Cambridge, MA	Harvard	4–0
60	November 21, 1973	New Haven, CT	Yale	3–1
61	November 22, 1974	Cambridge, MA	Tie	1–1
62	November 21, 1975	Cambridge, MA	Harvard	2–1
63	November 13, 1976	Cambridge, MA	Tie	1–1
64	November 11, 1977	Cambridge, MA	Harvard	6–1
65	November 17, 1978	Cambridge, MA	Harvard	1–0
66	November 16, 1979	New Haven, CT	Yale	1–0
67	November 22, 1980	Cambridge, MA	Harvard	2–1
68	November 12, 1981	New Haven, CT	Yale	1–0
69	November 20, 1982	Cambridge, MA	Yale	4–0
70	November 19, 1983	New Haven, CT	Harvard	3–0
71	November 17, 1984	Cambridge, MA	Harvard	1–0
72	November 23, 1985	New Haven, CT	Harvard	4–1
73	November 16, 1986	Cambridge, MA	Harvard	1–0
74	November 21, 1987	New Haven, CT	Tie	0–0
75	November 19, 1988	Cambridge, MA	Harvard	4–3
76	November 12, 1989	New Haven, CT	Yale	1–0
77	September 22, 1990	Cambridge, MA	Yale	2–0
78	September 28, 1991	New Haven, CT	Yale	3–1
79	September 27, 1992	Cambridge, MA	Harvard	2–1
80	October 15, 1993	New Haven, CT	Yale	2–1
81	October 16, 1994	Cambridge, MA	Harvard	4–1
82	October 14, 1995	New Haven, CT	Harvard	3–1
83	September 28, 1996	Cambridge, MA	Harvard	4–3
84	September 26, 1997	New Haven, CT	Tie	2–2
85	September 26, 1998	Cambridge, MA	Yale	5–4
86	September 25, 1999	New Haven, CT	Yale	3–0
87	October 14, 2000	Cambridge, MA	Harvard	3–2

No.	Date	Location	Winner	Score
88	September 8, 2001	New Haven, CT	Harvard	4–2
89	October 19, 2002	Cambridge, MA	Harvard	2–0
90	October 4, 2003	New Haven, CT	Yale	1–0
91	October 2, 2004	Cambridge, MA	Yale	1–0
92	October 1, 2005	New Haven, CT	Yale	3–1
93	September 30, 2006	Cambridge, MA	Harvard	3–2
94	November 17, 2007	New Haven, CT	Harvard	4–0
95	October 4, 2008	Cambridge, MA	Harvard	1–0
96	October 3, 2009	New Haven, CT	Harvard	1–0
97	October 2, 2010	Cambridge, MA	Harvard	1–0
98	October 1, 2011	New Haven, CT	Yale	1–0
99	September 29, 2012	Cambridge, MA	Tie	0–0
100	October 5, 2013	New Haven, CT	Yale	2–1
101	October 4, 2014	Cambridge, MA	Harvard	1–0
102	October 3, 2015	New Haven, CT	Harvard	3–1
103	October 1, 2016	Cambridge, MA	Tie	3–3
104	September 30, 2017	New Haven, CT	Harvard	2–1
105	September 29, 2018	Cambridge, MA	Harvard	1–0
106	October 4, 2019	New Haven, CT	Yale	3–1
107	October 2, 2021	New Haven, CT	Tie	0–0
108	October 22, 2022	New Haven, CT	Harvard	2–1
109	October 14, 2023	Cambridge, MA	Harvard	3–1
110	November 10, 2023	Philadelphia, PA	Yale	4–0
111	October 12, 2024	New Haven, CT	Harvard	1–0
112	October 11, 2025	Cambridge, MA	Tie	1–1
Series: Harvard leads 56–42–14

== Women's results ==
Harvard victories	Yale victories	Tie games

No.	Date	Location	Winner	Score
1	November 11, 1977	New Haven, CT	Harvard	2–0
2	November 17, 1978	Cambridge, MA	Harvard	1–0
3	November 11, 1979	New Haven, CT	Harvard	2–1
4	November 1, 1980	New Haven, CT	Harvard	3–0
5	November 13, 1981	New Haven, CT	Harvard	4–1
6	November 6, 1982	Cambridge, MA	Harvard	1–0
7	October 31, 1983	New Haven, CT	Harvard	2–0
8	October 30, 1984	Cambridge, MA	Harvard	2–1
9	October 29, 1985	New Haven, CT	Harvard	3–0
10	October 28, 1986	Cambridge, MA	Harvard	2–0
11	October 27, 1987	New Haven, CT	Harvard	2–1
12	October 25, 1988	Cambridge, MA	Harvard	2–0
13	October 24, 1989	New Haven, CT	Harvard	1–0
14	October 23, 1990	Cambridge, MA	Yale	1–0
15	October 22, 1991	New Haven, CT	Harvard	2–0
16	October 20, 1992	Cambridge, MA	Yale	1–0
17	October 16, 199	New Haven, CT	Yale	2–0

No.	Date	Location	Winner	Score
18	October 15, 1994	Cambridge, MA	Harvard	4–2
19	October 14, 1995	New Haven, CT	Harvard	2–0
20	September 28, 1996	Cambridge, MA	Harvard	2–1
21	September 27, 1997	New Haven, CT	Yale	3–2
22	September 26, 1998	Cambridge, MA	Harvard	2–1
23	September 25, 1999	New Haven, CT	Harvard	1–0
24	October 14, 2000	Cambridge, MA	Harvard	3–1
25	September 29, 2001	New Haven, CT	Harvard	1–0
26	October 19, 2002	Cambridge, MA	Yale	3–2
27	October 4, 2003	New Haven, CT	Tie	0–0
28	October 2, 2004	Cambridge, MA	Harvard	1–0
29	October 1, 2005	New Haven, CT	Yale	2–1
30	September 30, 2006	Cambridge, MA	Yale	1–0
31	September 29, 2007	New Haven, CT	Yale	2–1
32	October 4, 2008	Cambridge, MA	Harvard	3–1
33	October 20, 2009	New Haven, CT	Harvard	3–2
34	October 2, 2010	Cambridge, MA	Harvard	2–1

No.	Date	Location	Winner	Score
35	October 1, 2011	New Haven, CT	Harvard	2–1
36	September 29, 2012	Cambridge, MA	Harvard	1–0
37	October 5, 2013	New Haven, CT	Harvard	3–1
38	October 4, 2014	Cambridge, MA	Tie	0–0
39	October 3, 2015	New Haven, CT	Harvard	4–0
40	October 1, 2016	Cambridge, MA	Harvard	2–1
41	September 30, 2017	New Haven, CT	Yale	3–0
42	September 29, 2018	Cambridge, MA	Harvard	1–0
43	October 5, 2019	New Haven, CT	Harvard	1–0
44	October 2, 2021	New Haven, CT	Harvard	2–0
45	October 1, 2022	Cambridge, MA	Harvard	6–0
46	October 28, 2023	New Haven, CT	Harvard	5–2
47	November 2, 2024	Cambridge, MA	Harvard	3–1
48	October 12, 2025	New Haven, CT	Harvard	2–0
Series: Harvard leads 37–9–2

== See also ==
- Harvard–Yale football rivalry
- Harvard–Yale hockey rivalry
- Harvard–Yale Regatta
