= Mike Constantino =

American soccer player (born 1969)

Personal information
- Full name: Michael Constantino
- Date of birth: February 5, 1969 (age 57)
- Place of birth: New York, United States
- Height: 5 ft 8 in (1.73 m)
- Position: Forward

Youth career
- 1986: Penn Quakers
- 1988–1990: Penn Quakers

International career
| Years | Team | Apps | (Gls) |
| 1987 | United States U20 | | |
| 1988 | United States | 1 | (0) |

Michael Constantino (born February 5, 1969) is a former U.S. soccer forward. He earned one cap with the U.S. national team and was a member of the U.S. team at the 1987 FIFA World Youth Championship.

== Youth ==
Constantino graduated from the Friends Academy where he was a 1986 Parade Magazine High School All American soccer player. He attended the University of Pennsylvania where he played on the men's soccer team in 1986 and then from 1988 to 1990. He took the 1987 season off to play with the United States U-20 men's national soccer team. He returned to Penn in 1988 and completed his four seasons in 1990. He scored thirty career goals and was All Ivy League in 1986 and 1988. In May 2005, he was named to the University of Penn all century soccer team.

== National teams ==
In 1987, Constantino was selected for the U.S. team which went to the U-20 World Cup in Chile. Constantino played all three games as the U.S. went 1–2 in group play; failing to qualify for the second round. Constantino earned his lone cap with the United States men's national soccer team in a 1–0 loss to Guatemala on January 10, 1988, in Guatemala City. He came off for Joey Kirk.

Constantino was a member of the first USA team to beat Mexico at the World Cup level. They knocked off Mexico, 3–0, in which Constantino scored the third goal, in the 1986 CONCACAF tournament in Trinidad. The team qualified for the World Cup in Chile.

== Post-playing career ==
In July 1996, Constantino was hired by Bear Stearns. He remained with the company for twelve years, moving to GMAC in September 2008.
