= Dieter Ficken =

German-American soccer player and coach

Personal information
- Date of birth: June 14, 1944 (age 82)
- Place of birth: Bremen, Gau Weser-Ems, Germany
- Position: Forward

College career
Years	Team	Apps	(Gls)
1962–1965	Long Island University		

Senior career*
Years	Team	Apps	(Gls)
1970–1974	S.C. Eintracht		

International career
1972	United States	1	(0)

Managerial career
- 1974–1975: Long Island University (assistant)
- 1976–1978: Long Island University
- 1979–2005: Columbia University
- 2007–2008: LIU Post
- * Club domestic league appearances and goals

Dieter Ficken (born June 14, 1944) is a German-American former soccer forward and coach who spent his club career in the U.S. third division German American Soccer League. He earned one cap with the U.S. national team. He coached collegiate soccer from 1974 to 2008.

== Player ==
=== Youth ===
Born in Bremen, Germany, Ficken grew up in Park Slope neighborhood of Brooklyn, New York. His family had traveled to the U.S. when he was nine for a visit, but ended up staying in the U.S. where he lived with an aunt Ficken graduated from John Jay High School then attended Long Island University where he played on the men's soccer team from 1962 to 1965. He graduated in 1966 with a bachelor's degree in business management. He returned to LIU to gain a master's degree in finance in 1970. Following graduation, Ficken worked as an investment banker and in real estate before turning to coaching 1974.

=== Club ===
Ficken played for S.C. Eintracht of the German American Soccer League from 1970 until 1974.

=== National team ===
Ficken played for the U.S. team at the 1967 Pan American Games. The U.S. went 1–2 in the group stage and did not qualify for the second round. Ficken earned one cap with the U.S. national team in a 2–1 World Cup qualification loss to Mexico on September 10, 1972, in Los Angeles.

== Coach ==
In 1974, Ficken entered the coaching ranks as an assistant with Long Island University. He became head coach of LIU in 1976. Before leaving the school in 1979, he led the team to a 39–9–7 record. Columbia University hired Ficken as its men's soccer coach in 1979. During his twenty-seven seasons, he led the team to a 252–139–53 record and the 1983 NCAA championship game where it lost to the University of Indiana. That year, he was named the NCAA Coach of the Year. He announced his retirement from Columbia on January 13, 2006. On March 6, 2007, Ficken returned to Long Island University to become the men's soccer coach. Now Ficken coaches the u16 New York Cosmos East academy club
