= Brian Tompkins =

English football coach

Brian Tompkins is the former coach of Yale Varsity Soccer. He joined Yale in 1996 and helped Yale to win its first Ivy League title since 1991, in 2005. Before he joined Yale, Tompkins had also built the University of Wisconsin–Milwaukee into a national soccer power. It was announced in August that 2014 would be his last year coaching, and that he would be moving into the administration following the season.

He was born in London, England, and first went to the United States in 1980 as a part of a summer exchange program working with inner-city children. He returned for several summers and later became an assistant boys' soccer coach at Homestead High School in Mequon, Wisconsin, under coach Bob Gansler. In 1999, as head coach of Varsity Soccer at Yale, Tompkins lead the Bulldogs to a school-record 13 wins, an appearance in the NCAA Tournament for the first time since 1991 and a final national ranking of 18th.

Tompkins has done charitable work for several organizations. He organized a soccer/reading camp for underprivileged children, volunteered for the Midwest Athletes Against Childhood Cancer Fund and worked at Camp Heartland, a camp for young AIDS victims in Wisconsin.

Tompkins is a 1979 graduate of Bingley College with a degree in education. He and his wife, Kristin, reside in Milford and have one child, Ava. Tompkins also has an older daughter, Hayley.
