= Haverford Fords men's soccer =

American college soccer team

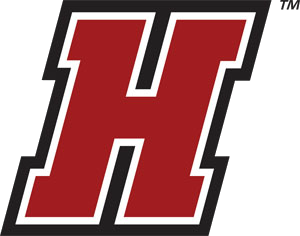
- Founded: 1901; 125 years ago
- University: Haverford College
- Head coach: Kevin Brenner (1st season)
- Conference: Centennial
- Location: Haverford, Pennsylvania
- Stadium: Walton Field (Capacity: 100)
- Nickname: Fords
- Colors: Red and black
Home	Away

Pre-tournament ASHA championships
- 1902

Pre-tournament IFRA championships
- 1902

Pre-tournament ISFA/ISFL championships
- 1905, 1906, 1907, 1908, 1911, 1915, 1918, 1926, 1945

NCAA Tournament Quarterfinals
- DIII: 2015

NCAA Tournament Round of 16
- DIII: 1980, 2015

NCAA Tournament Round of 32
- DIII: 2012, 2015

NCAA Tournament appearances
- DIII: 1976, 1977, 1980, 2012, 2015, 2016, 2018

Conference Tournament championships
- 1938, 1939, 1941, 1942, 1945, 1950, 1953, 1954, 1956, 1976, 1978, 1981, 1982, 1984, 1988, 1992, 2011, 2012, 2015, 2016, 2018

Conference Regular Season championships
- 1924, 1938, 1939, 1941, 1942, 1945, 1950, 1953, 1988

For information on all Haverford College sports, see Haverford Fords

The Haverford Fords men's soccer team is a varsity intercollegiate athletic team of Haverford College in Haverford, Pennsylvania, United States. The team is a member of the Centennial Conference, which is part of the National Collegiate Athletic Association's Division III.

Haverford's first men's soccer team was fielded in 1901. The team plays its home games at Walton Field on the Haverford campus. The Fords are coached by Zach Ward.

== History ==
By 1900, soccer had become popular among cricket clubs in Philadelphia so they established a league. Founding members were Belmont, Germantown, Kensington, and Frankford. The popularity of the sport also attracted Haverford students, with soccer and cricket becoming the favorite sports. Richard Gummere, who had played to play soccer at England, introduced the game to Haverford College, being played at the end of cricket season. The students formed a team to play to 1902 season. The team debuted with a win to Germantown, in a match of the recently formed "Philadelphia Cricket Clubs League", a soccer competition established by cricket clubs where the sport had increased its popularity among members.

For 1905, Gummere designated himself as captain, while Canadian Wilfred Mustard (who was a Latin professor at the college, apart from having played soccer at the University of Toronto) was appointed as coach of the team.

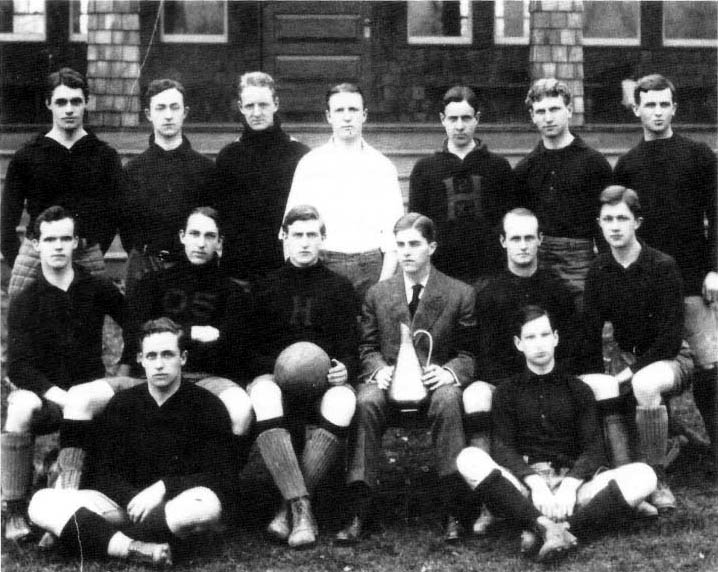
1904–05 Haverford team, national champions

The Fords have the distinction of winning the first three Intercollegiate Soccer Football Association national championships, the unofficial national championship that served as the predecessor to the NCAA Division I men's soccer tournament from 1905 until 1958. The 1904–05 team is considered by some to be the first organized collegiate national championship to be won by a program.

The team would continue their early 20th century success before winning the ISFA titles in 1906, 1907, 1911 and 1918.

In 1924, the program won the Pennsylvania Intercollegiate Association Football League season.

The 1945 team was undefeated. Success continued under Jimmy Mills, who was coach from 1949 to 1970. Under coach Dave Felsen, Haverford won the Middle Atlantic Conference Southern Division five times in the period from 1976 to 1982.

The team won three more MAC South titles under Joe Amorim, who was named head coach in 1983.

Haverford won a school-record 17 games in 1992. The team became the first men's soccer program to record 700 all-time wins, in September 2002, when the team defeated Neumann 7–0.

== Players ==
=== Current roster ===
As of November 2025 Note: Flags indicate national team as defined under FIFA eligibility rules; some limited exceptions apply. Players may hold more than one non-FIFA nationality.

No.	Pos.	Nation	Player
0	GK	USA	Grayson Benson
1	GK	USA	Aaron Cohen
2	DF	USA	Sam Kinsey
4	DF	USA	Josh Brown
5	DF	USA	Pavel Yurkov
6	MF	USA	Max Lovinger
7	MF	USA	Aaron Park
8	MF	USA	John Dowd
9	FW	USA	Andrew Fritz
10	MF	USA	Thomas Vanni

No.	Pos.	Nation	Player
11	MF	USA	Gabe Knopf
12	FW	USA	Miha Dakolias
14	MF	USA	Jack Bonner
15	MF	USA	Thomas Zamsky
16	MF	USA	Jonathan D'Amour
17	DF	USA	Tyler Jones
18	MF	USA	Aidan Lacy
19	MF	USA	Aidan Wong
20	MF	USA	Aiden Lee
33	GK	USA	Ollie McNamara

== Coaching history ==
Haverford has had 19 men's soccer coaches in their program's history. The most recent head coach was Zach Ward, the men's soccer coach from 2018 until February, 2023.

Years	Coach	G	W	L	T	Pct.
1901–1908	Wilfred Mustard	64	31	25	8	.000
1908–1909	Harold Morris	11	6	3	2	.000
1909–1910	Carey Thomas	11	3	4	4	.000
1910–1912	Frank Huish	39	16	16	7	.000
1912–1913	Francis James	18	12	3	3	.000
1913–1915	James Thomas	24	12	9	3	.000
1915–1920	George Young	62	39	14	9	.000
1920–1921	Daniel Oates	21	12	7	2	.000
1922–1934	James McPete	124	71	29	24	.000
1935–1940	James Gentle	62	36	24	2	.000
1941	Edgar Redington, Jr.	10	7	2	1	.000
1942–1946	Ray Mullan	41	26	12	3	.000
1947–1948	Edgar Redington, Jr.	17	8	7	2	.000
1949–1970	Jimmy Mills	238	124	94	20	.000
1971–1977	David Felsen	99	53	39	7	.000
1978–1982	Skip Jarocki	81	43	31	7	.000
1983–2007	Joe Amorim	469	214	223	32	.000
2009–2010	Bill Brady	33	14	17	2	.000
2011–2017	Shane Rineer	138	87	38	13	.000
2018–2022	Zach Ward	37	23	10	4	.000

== Titles ==
=== National ===
Note: They were considered national titles before the establishment of the NCAA soccer tournament in 1959

- ACCL (1): 1901–02 (Note: Co-champions, along with Christian Brothers.)
- ISFA (7): 1904–05, 1905–06, 1906–07, 1908, 1911, 1915, 1917

=== Conference ===
- Middle Atlantic tournament (7): 1938, 1939, 1941, 1942, 1945, 1953, 1988
  - Southern Division tournament (8): 1976, 1978, 1980, 1981, 1982, 1984, 1988, 1992
