= Intercollegiate Soccer Football Association =

Sport organization in the U.S.

- Abbreviation: ISFA
- Predecessor: Intercollegiate Soccer Football League
- Founded: 1905
- Dissolved: 1958; 68 years ago
- Legal status: Association
- Region served: United States and Canada
- Members: 50 schools

The Intercollegiate Soccer Football Association (abbreviated ISFA) was a sports governing body that ruled the practice of college soccer in the United States from 1905 to 1958.

Before the National Collegiate Athletic Association (NCAA) held its first men's National Collegiate Soccer Championship in 1959, national champions were selected by a committee of the ISFA based on season records and competition. In addition, the College Soccer Bowl tournament was held from 1950–1952 (following the 1949–1951 seasons) for the purpose of deciding a national champion on the field. The Soccer Bowl was a one-site competition involving four teams selected by college soccer administrators. However, the ISFA committee continued to select the national champion in those three years (in 1950 selecting as champion a team that did not participate in the second Soccer Bowl).

== History ==
College soccer started in Northeast colleges and at private schools in the late 19th century, while club soccer was mostly played in the Midwest and the South. In the West, Stanford started up a soccer program in 1911, University of San Francisco in 1932, and UCLA in 1937, playing largely amateur teams. In 1945, at the end of the world war, the ISFA had only 22 member college teams. This grew to over 50 by 1947.

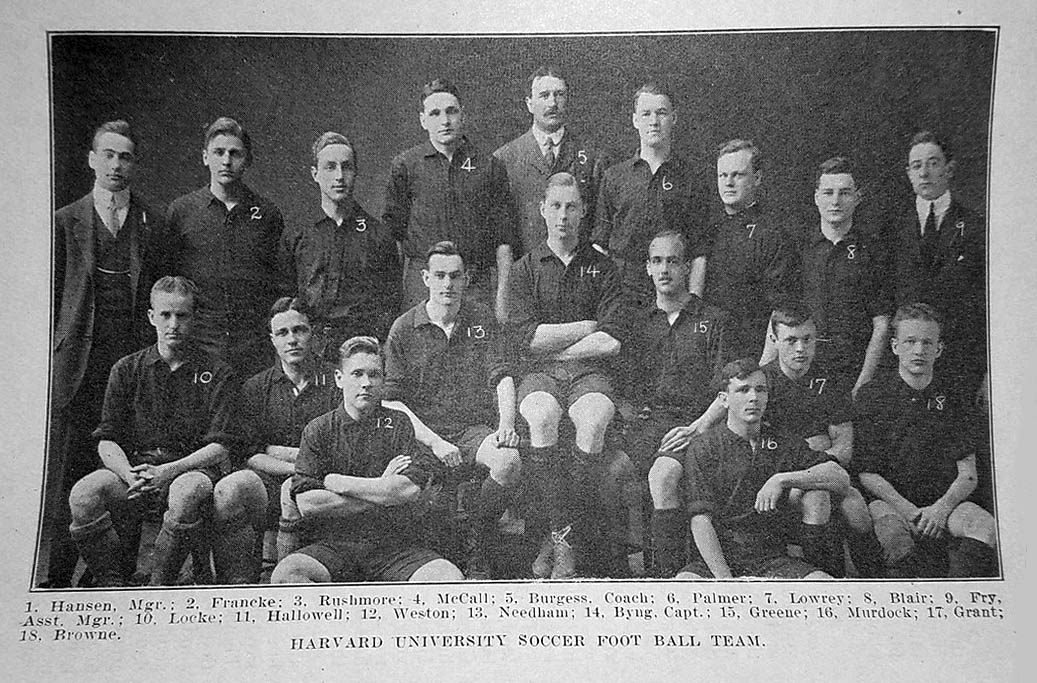
1912 Harvard team

From 1905 through 1925, the Intercollegiate Soccer Football League (an Ivy League forerunner) determined an annual champion in college soccer. The league was dissolved after the 1925 season when Harvard and Yale threatened to resign citing dissatisfaction with the organization and scheduling saying it took players away from their educational studies too frequently.

The former league pledged to create a new representative soccer association that could help govern the sport at a collegiate level. Soon after the Intercollegiate Soccer Football Association was born offering an annual Outstanding Soccer Team award, the mythical national soccer championship, through 1935 and from 1946 through 1958.

== Member Schools ==
Team	City	Joined
Brown	Providence, RI	1931
Columbia	New York, NY	
Cornell	Ithaca, NY	
Dartmouth	Hanover, NH	
Franklin & Marshall	Lancaster, PA	
Harvard	Cambridge, MA	
Haverford	Haverford, PA	
Lafayette	Easton, PA	1928
Lehigh	Bethlehem, PA	
MIT	Cambridge, MA	1931
Navy	Annapolis, MD	
Penn	Philadelphia, PA	
Princeton	Princeton, NJ	
Penn State	Centre County, PA	1926
San Francisco	San Francisco, CA	
Springfield	Springfield, MA	1931
Swarthmore	Swarthmore, PA	
Temple	Philadelphia, PA	
West Chester	West Chester, PA	
Yale	New Haven, CT	

== ISFL / ISFA National Champions ==
College champions were determined by various methods over the years as listed below. They are all considered unofficial.

- 1904–1925: Champion of the Intercollegiate Soccer Football League
- 1926–1935: Determined by the Intercollegiate Soccer Football Association
- 1936–1940: No selection by ISFA. Listed are outstanding teams that claim a share of the championship.
- 1941–1945: No selection by ISFA. Intercollegiate soccer was severely curtailed by world war.
- 1946–1958: Determined by the Intercollegiate Soccer Football Association
- 1949–1951: Seasons for which Soccer Bowl was played (two of these were played early the following year)

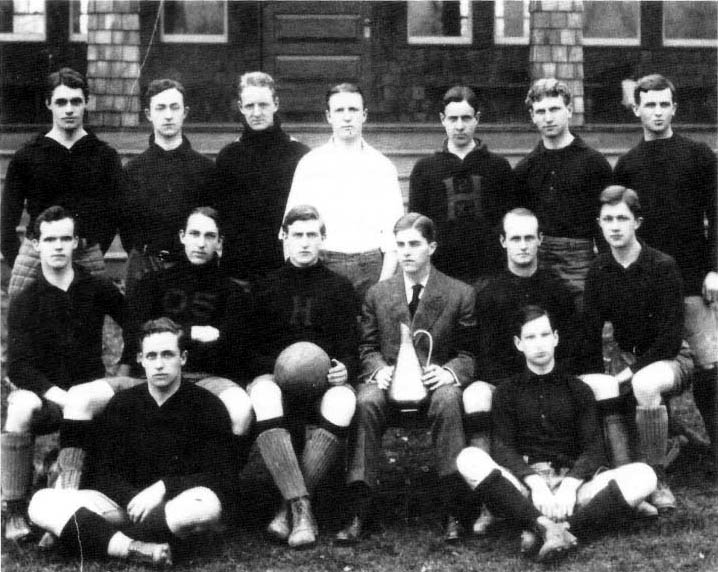
1904–05 Haverford team

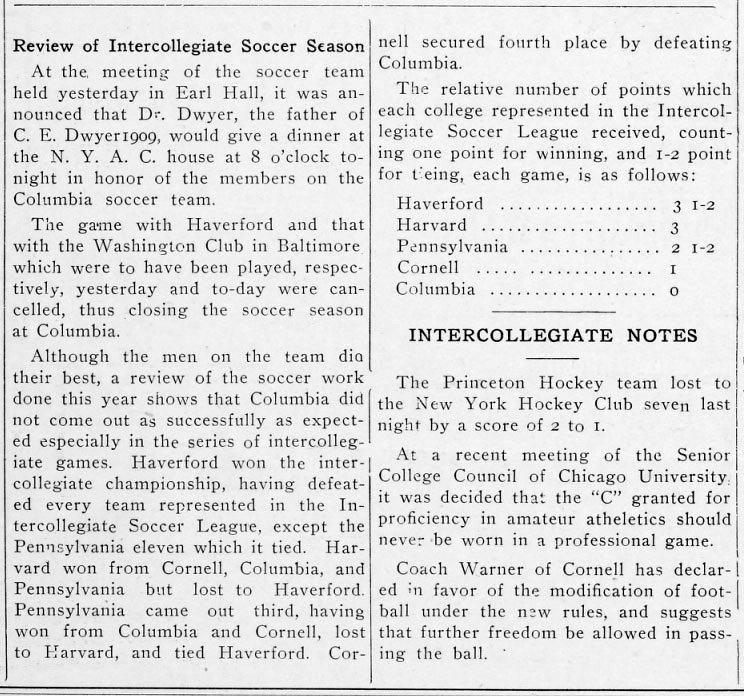
Review of the 1906 season on Columbia Spectator nº 66, 15 Dec 1906

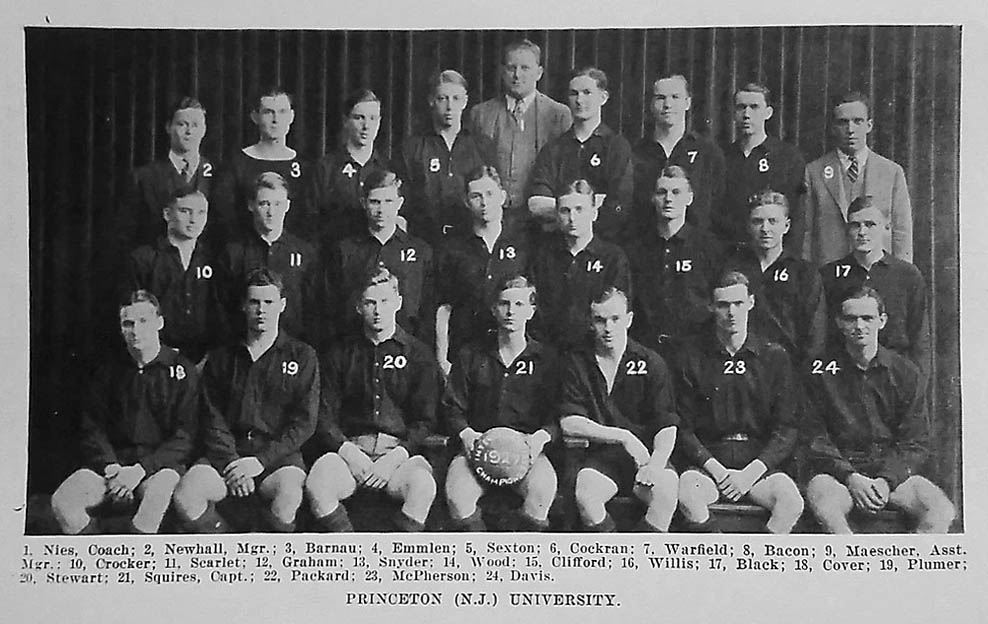
1928 team of Princeton holding a ball with the legend "1927 champions"

Ed.	Season	Champion
1	1904–05	Haverford (1)
2	1905–06	Haverford (2)
3	1906–07	Haverford (3)
4	1908	Haverford (4) (Note: Title shared.)
4	1908	Yale (1)
5	1909	Columbia (1)
6	1910	Columbia (2)
7	1911	Haverford (5)
8	1912	Yale (2)
9	1913	Harvard (1)
10	1914	Penn (1)
10	1914	Harvard (2)
11	1915	Haverford (6)
12	1916	Penn (2)
13	1917	Haverford (7)
–	1918	no competition held
14	1919	Penn (3)
15	1920	Penn (4)
16	1921	Princeton (1)
17	1922	Princeton (2)
18	1923	Penn (5)
19	1924	Penn (6)
20	1925	Princeton (3)
21	1926	Penn State (1)
21	1926	Princeton (4)
21	1926	Harvard (3)
22	1927	Princeton (5)
23	1928	Yale (3)
24	1929	Penn State (2)
25	1930	Penn (7)
25	1930	Yale (4)
25	1930	Harvard (4)
26	1931	Penn (8)
27	1932	Penn (9)
27	1932	Navy (1)
28	1933	Penn State (3)
28	1933	Penn (10)
29	1934	Cornell (1)
30	1935	Yale (5)
31	1936	Penn State (4)
31	1936	Princeton (6)
31	1936	West Chester| (1)
31	1936	Syracuse (1)
32	1937	Penn State (5)
32	1937	Princeton (7)
32	1937	Springfield (1)
33	1938	Penn State (6)
34	1939	Penn State (7)
34	1939	Princeton (8)
35	1940	Penn State (8)
–	1941	No selection
–	1942	No selection
–	1943	No selection
–	1944	No selection
36	1945	Haverford (8)
37	1946	Springfield (2)
38	1947	Springfield (3)
39	1948	Connecticut (1)
40	1949	Penn State (9)
40	1949	San Francisco (1)
41	1950	West Chester (2)
42	1951	Temple (1)
43	1952	Franklin & Marshall (1)
44	1953	Temple (2)
45	1954	Penn State (10)
46	1955	Penn State (11)
46	1955	Brockport (1)
47	1956	Trinity (1)
48	1957	Springfield (4)
48	1957	City College of New York (1)
49	1958	Drexel (1)

=== Soccer Bowl ===
Ed.	Season	Champion	Score	Runner-up
1	1949	Penn State (1)	2–2	– (Note: Both teams were declared champions after a 2–2 tie with neither extra time nor penalties ran to decide a winner.)
1	1949	San Francisco (1)	2–2	–
2	1950	Penn State (2)	3–1	Purdue
3	1951	Temple (1)	2–0	San Francisco

Notes

== ISFL / ISFA titles by team ==
Team	Titles	Winning Years
Penn State	11	1926, 1929, 1933, 1936, 1937, 1938, 1939, 1940, 1949, 1954, 1955
Penn	10	1914, 1916, 1919, 1920, 1923, 1924, 1930, 1931, 1932, 1933
Princeton	8	1921, 1922, 1925, 1926, 1927, 1936, 1937, 1939
Haverford	7	1904–05, 1905–06, 1906–07, 1908, 1911, 1915, 1917
Yale	5	1908, 1912, 1928, 1930, 1935
Harvard	4	1913, 1914, 1926, 1930
Springfield	4	1937, 1946, 1947, 1957
Columbia	2	1909, 1910
Temple	2	1951, 1953
West Chester	2	1936, 1950
Navy	1	1932
Cornell	1	1934
Syracuse	1	1936
Connecticut	1	1948
San Francisco	1	1949
Franklin & Marshall	1	1952
Brockport	1	1955
Trinity	1	1956
City College of New York	1	1957
Drexel	1	1958
