= Yale Bulldogs men's soccer =

American university soccer team

- Founded: 1908; 118 years ago
- University: Yale University
- Head coach: Kylie Stannard (7th season)
- Conference: Ivy
- Location: New Haven, Connecticut, US
- Stadium: Reese Stadium (capacity: 3,000)
- Nickname: Bulldogs
- Colors: Yale blue and white
Home	Away

Pre-tournament ISFA/ISFL championships
- 1875, 1908, 1912, 1928, 1930, 1935, 1945

NCAA tournament Quarterfinals
- 1991

NCAA tournament Round of 16
- 1991

NCAA tournament Round of 32
- 1989, 1991, 1999

NCAA tournament appearances
- 1973, 1986, 1989, 1991, 1999, 2005, 2019, 2023

Conference tournament championships
- 2023

Conference regular season championships
- 1956, 1986, 1989, 1991, 2005, 2019

The Yale Bulldogs men's soccer program represents Yale University in NCAA Division I men's college soccer competitions. Founded in 1908, the Bulldogs compete in the Ivy League.

The Bulldogs are coached by Kylie Stannard, who was hired as the program's head coach in 2014. Yale play their home matches at Reese Stadium, on the campus of Yale University.

== History ==
Yale's first attempts with "kicking games" have roots in the 1860s, when the University, along with Princeton (then known as the College of Ottawa), Rutgers, and Brown, started to play a form of football that resembled the Association game.

Nevertheless, after a rugby football game played v Harvard in 1875, Yale dropped the association football in favor of rugby. That would be official in 1876 when Yale and other universities met at the Massasoit Convention in Springfield, Massachusetts, agreed to adopt most of the Rugby Football Union rules, with some variations,

The university fielded its first soccer team in 1908.

== Rivalries ==
Yale athletics have a longstanding rivalry with Harvard across all sports since 1875 when they first met in a rugby-style game, and it also translates to the men's soccer programs. Both representative teams have faced each other on an annual basis since 1907. The Crimson lead the series against the Bulldogs 53-38-12.

Yale has also a strong rivalry with Princeton, which is among the oldest in American sports since they played their first football game in 1873.

== Players ==
=== Current roster ===
As of 7 Sep 2024

Note: Flags indicate national team as defined under FIFA eligibility rules; some limited exceptions apply. Players may hold more than one non-FIFA nationality.

No.	Pos.	Nation	Player
0	GK	USA	Chris Edwards
1	GK	GER	Constantin Jung
2	DF	USA	Sven Meacham
3	MF	USA	Ryan Cote
4	DF	USA	Nick Miller
6	DF	USA	Jamie Orson
7	FW	USA	Alex Umana
8	MF	USA	Jonathan Seidman
9	FW	USA	Joseph Farouz
10	FW	USA	Quanah Brayboy
11	FW	USA	Aydin Jay
12	DF	USA	Vaughan Osga
13	FW	USA	Jorik Dammann
14	MF	USA	Teague McCammon

No.	Pos.	Nation	Player
15	FW	USA	Owen Bull
17	MF	BRA	Felipe Schwartz
18	MF	SCO	Luke Renforth
19	FW	USA	Salif Leintu
20	MF	AUS	George Stamboulidis
21	MF	USA	Andrew Seidman
22	DF	USA	TJ Presthus
23	MF	USA	Simon Adjakple
26	DF	USA	Justin Harris
28	DF	USA	Lior Gurion
29	GK	USA	Marco Borrego
30	FW	USA	Ryder Mills
34	MF	USA	Diego Zaffanella

== Coaches ==
=== Coaching history ===
Yale University has had nineteen coaches in their program's existence.

As of October 31, 2024

#	Years	Coach	Pld.	W	L	T
1	1907–1908	James Birnbaum	5	4	1	0
2	1908–1910	Cecil Herbert	9	3	3	3
3	1910–1912	Alexander Timm	8	6	2	2
4	1912–1913	Henry J. Greer	5	3	2	0
5	1913–1914	Robert H. Gamble	7	2	3	2
6	1914–1915	Waldo Tucker	11	4	5	2
7	1915–1916	George Haskell	8	3	5	0
8	1917–1918	M.B. Wood	4	1	3	0
9	1918–1919	Talbot Hunter	6	0	5	1
10	1919–1920	Albert Fearn	6	2	3	1
11	1920–1921	Horace Wilson	7	1	6	0
12	1921–1926	Morris Touchstone	43	15	18	10
13	1926–1949	Walter Leeman	218	131	55	32
14	1950–1965	Jack Marshall	183	103	61	19
15	1966–1973	Hubert Vogelsinger	99	38	45	16
16	1974–1977	Bill Killen	56	17	29	10
17	1978–1995	Steve Griggs	276	143	110	23
18	1996–2014	Brian Tompkins	325	138	148	39
19	2014–present	Kylie Stannard	100	30	55	15

== Honours ==
=== National championships ===
Yale has won six men's varsity soccer national championships, all of which were national championships prior to the NCAA Division I Men's Soccer Tournament. In 1908, 1912, 1928, 1930, 1935, 1945, they were determined as national champions by the Intercollegiate Soccer Football Association (ISFA).

Title No.	Season	Organizer	Record	Coach	Team Captain
1	1908	ISFA	4–1–0	James Birnbaum	Raymond McNulty
2	1912	ISFA	5–0–0	Alexander B. Timm	Walter G. Dickey
3	1928	ISFA	6–0–1	Walter Leeman	John Whitelaw
4	1930	ISFA	8–1–0	Walter Leeman	C.C. Hardy
5	1935	ISFA	12–0–0	Walter Leeman	Samuel Pond
6	1945	ISFA	8–0–2	Walter Leeman	Francis Brice

=== Conference championships ===
Title No.	Season	Organizer	Class	Coach
1	1956	Ivy League	Regular season	Jack Marshall
2	1986	Ivy League	Regular season	Steve Griggs
3	1989	Ivy League	Regular season	Steve Griggs
4	1991	Ivy League	Regular season	Steve Griggs
5	2005	Ivy League	Regular season	Brian Tompkins
6	2019	Ivy League	Regular season	Kylie Stannard
7	2023	Ivy League	Tournament	Kylie Stannard

== Seasons ==
=== NCAA Tournament history ===
Yale has appeared in seven NCAA Tournaments. Their most recent appearance came in 2023.

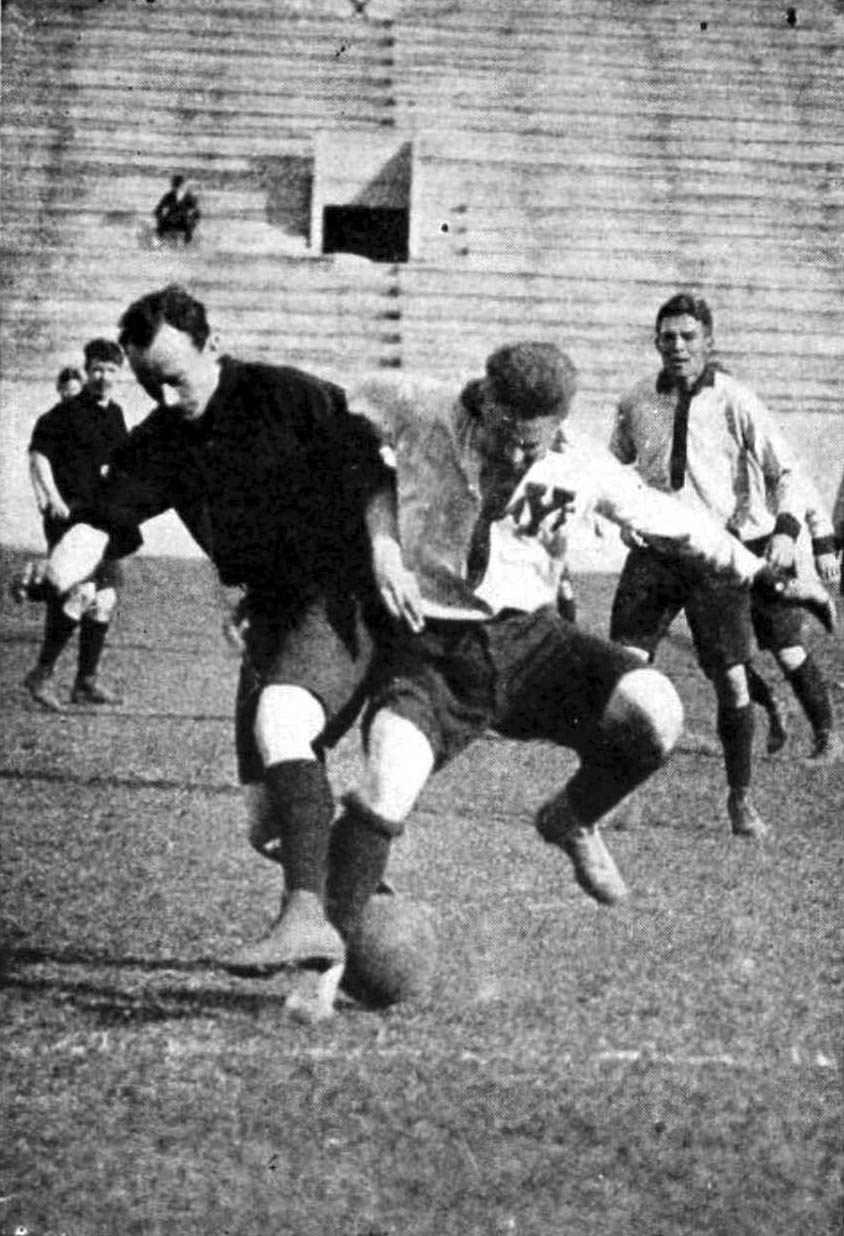
Yale (white shirts) vs Harvard game in 1922

Year	Record	Region	Round	Opponent	Results
1973	7–4–4	1	First round	Bridgeport	3–1
1973	7–4–4	1	Second round	Brown	1–2 (a.e.t.)
1986	11–2–2	1	First round	Harvard	1–2 (a.e.t.)
1989	12–5–0	1	First round	Hartwick	1–0
1989	12–5–0	1	Second round	Vermont	0–1
1991	12–4–2	1	First round	Boston University	3–2
1991	12–4–2	1	Second round	Seton Hall	4–3 (a.e.t.)
1991	12–4–2	1	Quarterfinals	Virginia	0–2
1999	13–5–1	2	First round	Rutgers	1–0 (a.e.t.)
1999	13–5–1	2	Second round	UConn	0–3
2005	10–4–4	1	First round	Stony Brook	1–2 (a.e.t.)
2019	13–3–2	4	First round	Boston College	0–3
2023	10–5–3	3	First round	Bryant	1–0
2023	10–5–3	3	Second round	Hofstra	0–2
