= Columbia Lions men's soccer =

American college soccer team

- Founded: 1906; 120 years ago
- University: Columbia University
- Head coach: Michael Casper
- Conference: Ivy
- Location: New York City, US
- Stadium: Rocco Commisso Stadium (capacity: 3,500)
- Nickname: Lions
- Colors: Columbia blue and white
Home	Away

Pre-tournament ISFA/ISFL championships
- 1909, 1910

NCAA tournament runner-up
- 1983

NCAA tournament Semifinals
- 1979, 1983

NCAA tournament Quarterfinals
- 1979, 1983

NCAA tournament Round of 16
- 1979, 1983

NCAA tournament appearances
- 1970, 1978, 1979, 1980, 1981, 1982, 1983, 1984, 1985, 1989, 1990, 1991, 1993, 2017

Conference Regular Season championships
- 1978, 1979, 1980, 1981, 1982, 1983, 1984, 1985, 1993, 2016

The Columbia Lions men's soccer team is an intercollegiate varsity sports team of Columbia University. The team is a member of the Ivy League of the National Collegiate Athletic Association.

The Lions fielded their first varsity team in 1906, and have since won 10 Ivy League Championships and have made 14 NCAA tournament appearances. Their most recent appearance in the NCAA Division I Men's Soccer Championship came in 2017 where the Lions reached the second round before losing 1–0 to Wake Forest in the 88' on a penalty kick.

== History ==
The University's soccer team was established in 1906, and the squad started its run on the sport competing in championships organized by the Intercollegiate Soccer Football Association (ISFA), the predecessor national soccer championship to the NCAA soccer tournament. Columbia finished its first ISFA season with a 1–1–2 record.

Columbia won two ISFA national championships, in 1909 (4–1–0 record) and 1910, with five Columbia players were College All-Americans. The squad achieved a 10–2–3 record.

Columbia's best season was in 1983 when the team achieved a 18–1–0 record (crowned Ivy League champion and NCAA championship runner-up after losing v Indiana. It was the Columbia's season with most wins.

== Players ==
=== Current roster ===
As of 16 Sep 2024

Note: Flags indicate national team as defined under FIFA eligibility rules; some limited exceptions apply. Players may hold more than one non-FIFA nationality.

No.	Pos.	Nation	Player
1	GK	USA	Andreas Zamanian
2	DF	USA	Carmine Falco
3	DF	USA	Bryan Cosman
4	DF	USA	Jackson ten Oever
5	MF	USA	Alessandro Franciosa
6	MF	USA	Jack McDaid
7	FW	USA	Adrien Wheaton-Schopp
8	MF	USA	Brandon Newman
9	FW	CZE	Christoph Kuttner
10	MF	BRA	Joao Lima
11	FW	USA	Ryan Kipness
12	MF	CAN	Ryan Yang
13	MF	USA	Luke Zielinski
14	DF	USA	Joe McDaid
15	FW	USA	Cy Sokolowski

No.	Pos.	Nation	Player
16	MF	USA	Will Case
18	MF	CAN	Lyon Atiencia
19	FW	USA	Andres Garcia
20	MF	CAN	Chad Baker
21	FW	SRB	Luka Peric
24	DF	USA	Rafa Romo
25	MF	USA	Peter Chang
26	MF	AUS	Jesse Greissman
27	DF	USA	Andrew Hilton II
28	MF	USA	Noah Hartzfeld
29	MF	USA	Will Carnoy
30	GK	USA	Dean Kelliher
33	GK	USA	Jay Sonthalia
42	GK	CAN	Alexander O'Brien

== Team honors ==
=== Conference championships ===
Columbia has won 10 Ivy League championships, their last being in the 2016–17 season.

#	Year	Conference	Coach	Overall record	Conference record
1	1978	Ivy	John Rennie	13–2–1	6–0–1
2	1979	Ivy	Dieter Ficken	14–4–1	6–1–0
3	1980	Ivy	Dieter Ficken	12–2–2	4–1–2
4	1981	Ivy	Dieter Ficken	10–2–4	6–1–0
5	1982	Ivy	Dieter Ficken	12–3–2	7–0–0
6	1983	Ivy	Dieter Ficken	18–1–0	7–0–0
7	1984	Ivy	Dieter Ficken	12–2–2	6–1–0
8	1985	Ivy	Dieter Ficken	12–3–2	6–0–1
9	1993	Ivy	Dieter Ficken	9-6-1	6–1-0
10	2016	Ivy	Kevin Anderson	13-3-1	5–1–1
