= Haverford Fords =

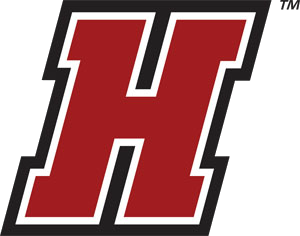
- University: Haverford College
- NCAA: Division III
- Conference: Centennial Conference
- Athletic director: Danielle Lynch
- Location: Haverford, Pennsylvania
- Varsity teams: 23 (10 male, 12 female, 1 co-ed)
- Colors: Red and black
- Mascot: Black squirrel (official)
- Website: haverfordathletics.com
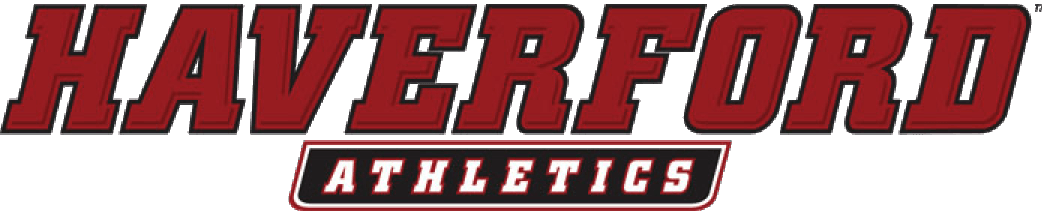

The Haverford Fords are the athletic teams Haverford College, who compete at the NCAA Division III level in the Centennial Conference. Haverford has the only varsity cricket team in the United States. Its men's and women's track and field and cross country teams are perennial powerhouses in their division. The outdoor track and field team won the first 16 Centennial Conference championships, and men's cross country has won all but two Centennial Conference championships. The soccer team is among the nation's oldest, having won its first intercollegiate match in 1905 against Harvard College. The lacrosse team has placed well nationally in the NCAA championships, while Haverford's fencing team has competed since the early 1930s.

== Athletic teams44 ==
=== Baseball ===
The New York Times called Haverford a pipeline to a front-office career in professional baseball, with a focus on sabermetrics (advanced statistics). As of summer 2015, it notes, "there are about 15 to 20 Haverford graduates working in prominent baseball-related jobs, as front-office executives, agents and talent evaluators." The current head coach is Dave Beccaria, an alumnus of and former junior varsity head coach at Johns Hopkins.

=== Basketball ===
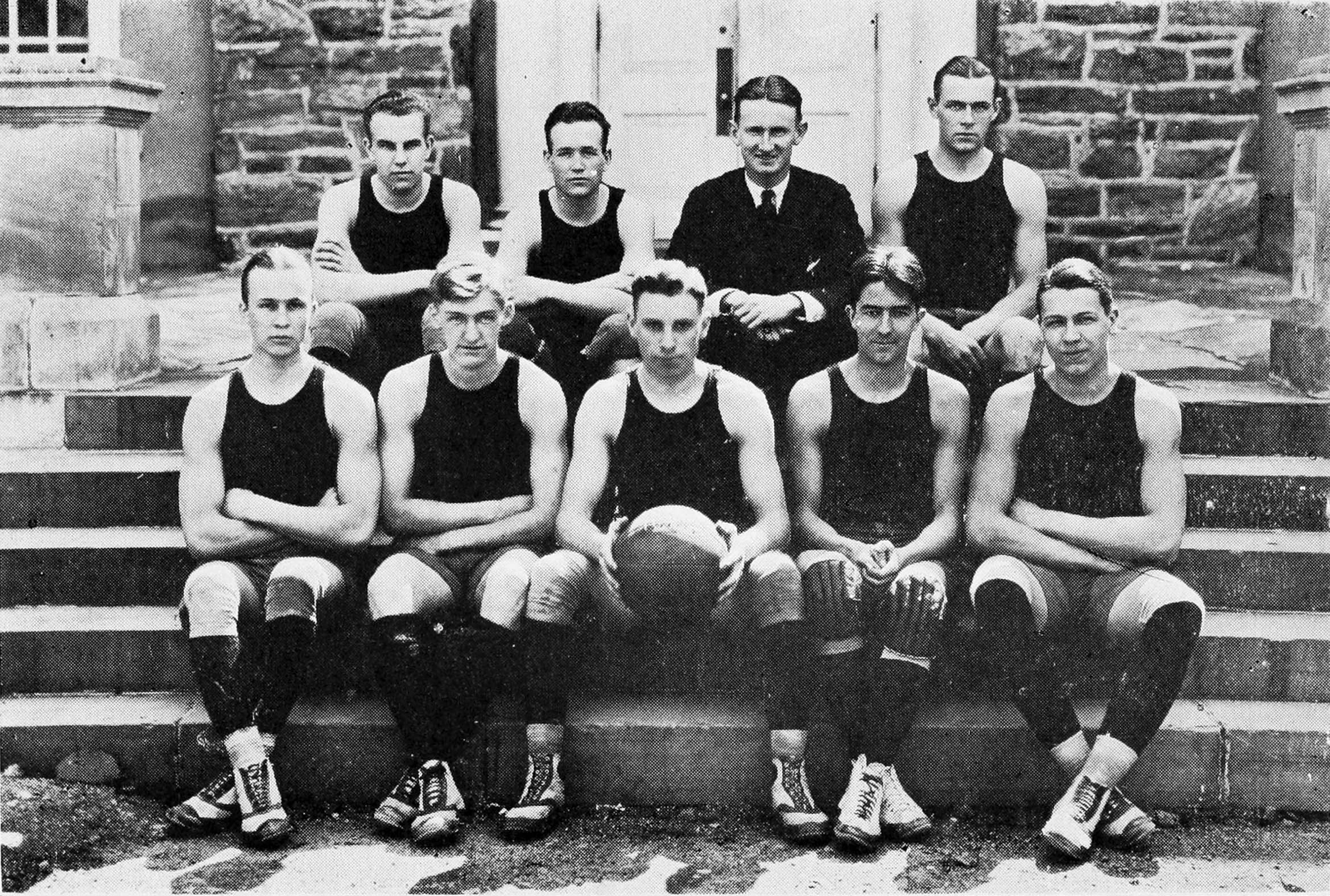
Basketball team c. 1920

The first intercollegiate basketball game played east of the Mississippi River occurred in Ryan Gym (now a lounging area for students) in 1895 between Haverford and Temple University. A former varsity star is Hunter R. Rawlings III, the former president of Cornell University.

=== Cricket ===
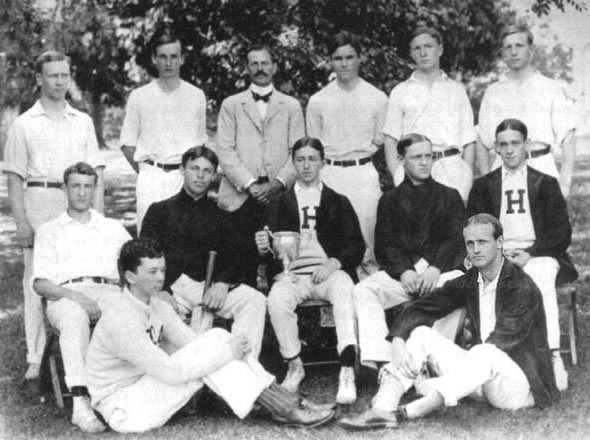
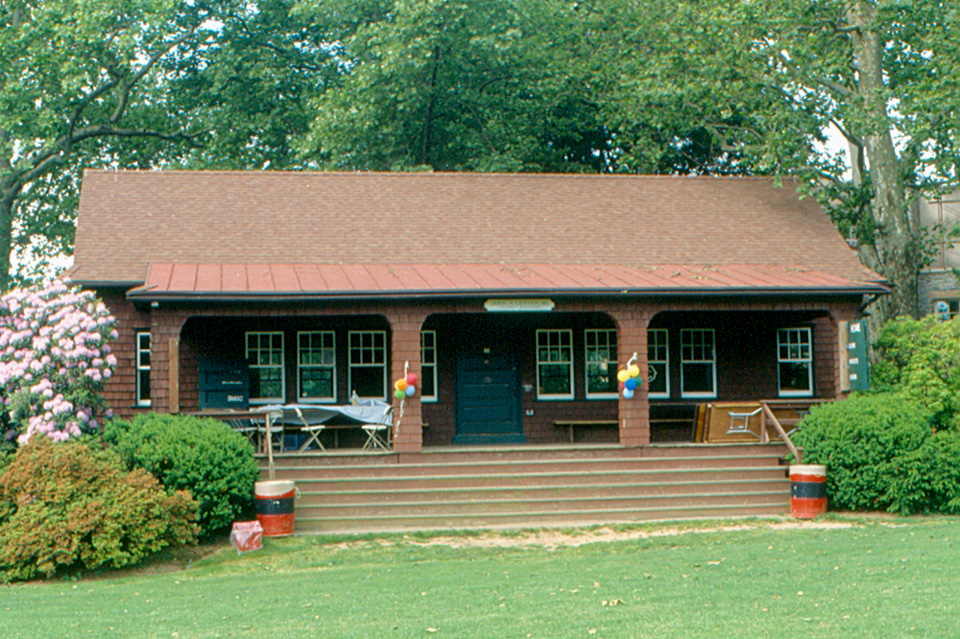
(Left): Early Haverford cricket team c. 1900; (right): Haverford College's John A Lester Cricket Pavilion (photo circa 1993), contiguous to Cope Field Cricket Pitch, which houses (on its lower level) the C.C. Morris (Class of 1904) cricket library.

Haverford has the only varsity cricket team in the United States, and ESPN Magazine has called Haverford "the epicenter of Philadelphia's cricket craze". Cricket was first played at the college briefly in the late 1830s, and it returned in 1856.

Haverford has a strong rivalry with the University of Pennsylvania's club team. The first match in this series was played in 1864 and has been believed to be the third-oldest intercollegiate contest in America, after the 1852 Harvard-Yale crew and 1859 Amherst-Williams baseball matches. The Intercollegiate Cricket Association existed in the late 19th and early 20th centuries (1881–1924), and Haverford won its championship 19 times (1884, 1890 (tie), 1892 (tie), 1893, 1895, 1896, 1898, 1902, 1903 (tie), 1904, 1905, 1906 (tie), 1910, 1915, 1916, 1919, 1922 (tie), 1923, 1924). Haverford's current team has a heavy contingent of students of South Asian heritage, and the XI team regularly travels to Oxbridge for games. The current coach is Kamran Khan, former player for the United States national cricket team from 1979 to 1990 and President of the United States of America Cricket Association from 1999 to 2000. He has coached Haverford's cricket team since 1974.

=== Fencing ===
The fencing team has competed since the early 1930s and is a member of both the Middle Atlantic Collegiate Fencing Association (MACFA) and the National Intercollegiate Women's Fencing Association (NIWFA). Recently retired coach, David Littell, fenced in the 1988 Olympics in Seoul, South Korea. In 2007, the Haverford fencing team fenced an undefeated MACFA season (a school record, since repeated in 2010) and won its third championship. Other championships were won in 1983 and 2004. The current Haverford coach is Chris Spencer, formerly head coach of Mount Holyoke College. Under Spencer the Haverford team has become a top Division III program, defeating Division I teams such as New York University and UNC. Haverford won three consecutive MACFA championships in 2010-2012.

=== Football ===
Haverford had a football team which competed between 1879 and 1972, when it was disbanded due to low player participation from students. The team was rivals with Swarthmore.

=== Lacrosse ===
The Haverford men's lacrosse team has fallen from its national power status. After defeating Gettysburg College in 2009 and 2010, qualifying for the 2008, 2009 and 2010 NCAA tournaments, advancing to the 2010 NCAA tournament quarterfinals (where it took Salisbury University into overtime) and registering other high profile wins, the team has in recent years struggled. The current head coach is Nick Taylor who has been at the helm for three seasons. Former head coach Brendan Dawson is now the head coach of the Haverford School. Former head coach Colin Bathory is an alumnus of the College. Former head coach Mike Murphy is now the head coach of the Penn Quakers men's lacrosse.

=== Soccer ===
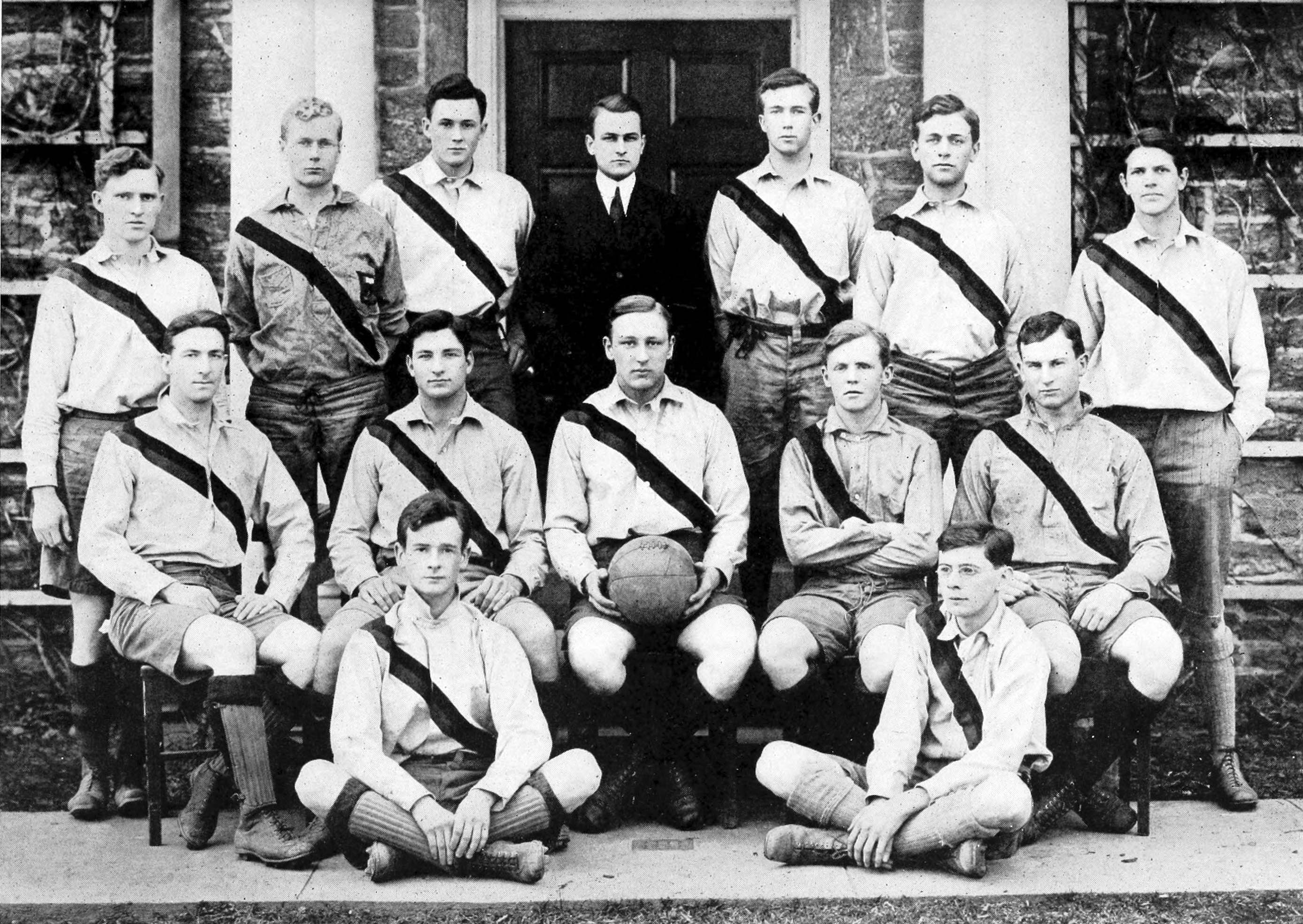
Haverford soccer team of 1910

Haverford's soccer team, the nation's oldest, won the first match of the newly-formed Intercollegiate Soccer Football League in 1905, beating Harvard College. It is of interest that Harvard's team was founded by a Haverford alumnus during his graduate education there. Haverford soccer squads were named national intercollegiate champions three times by the Intercollegiate Soccer Football Association in 1911, 1915 and 1917.

This was well prior to the NCAA's inaugural post-season national championship tournament, which began in 1959. The men's soccer team won its first NCAA playoff game in 1980, defeating Elizabethtown College 4-3. In 2013, both the men's and women's soccer teams were crowned Centennial Conference Champions. While the men's team defeated Wesleyan College in the first round of the 2013 NCAA tournament, the women's team lost to MIT in the first round. The 2015 season was the most successful in the history of Haverford men's soccer, as the team won the Centennial Conference championship and advanced to the NCAA playoff's Elite Eight.

=== Tennis ===
Haverford has a long tradition of producing notable tennis players. Recently, the team has been known for recruiting the most athletes from the state of Hawaii out of all NCAA varsity athletic teams. Ann Koger was the longtime coach of the women's team from 1981 to 2016.

=== Track and cross country ===
The men's and women's track and field and cross country teams are perennial powerhouses in their division. The men's outdoor track and field team won the first 16 Centennial Conference championships, while the men's cross country team has won all but two Centennial Conference championships, reclaiming the title from Dickinson in the 2010 fall season. In the 2010 NCAA National Cross Country Championship, the men's team finished first, its highest finish ever and the only NCAA championship ever won by any Haverford team. The women's team recently captured at least four consecutive conference titles. In 1997, Karl Paranya '97 became the first (and only) Division III athlete to run a four-minute mile, clocking 3:57.6. The history of Haverford track also includes former team captain Philip Noel-Baker 1908, who later captained Great Britain's 1924 Olympic team, upon which the movie Chariots of Fire is based, and became a Nobel Peace Prize winner years later in 1959. Also of note is former captain Andrew Lanham, a winner of the 2010 Rhodes Scholarship. Three Haverford runners have won individual Division III men's cross country national championships: Seamus McElligott in 1990, JB Haglund in 2001, and Anders Hulleberg in 2010.

=== Volleyball ===
The women's volleyball team competed in the NCAA tournament in 2006 and 2007 after winning its first Centennial Conference titles. In 2007, the team hosted the regional NCAA tournament, where it advanced to the regional championship, ultimately losing to the defending national champion, Juniata.

== National championships ==
=== Team ===
Sport	Association	Division	Year	Opponent/Runner-up	Score
Men's cross country (1)	NCAA	Division III	2010	North Central (IL)	87–104
