= Penn Quakers men's soccer =

American college soccer team

- Founded: 1908; 118 years ago
- University: University of Pennsylvania
- Head coach: Brian Gill (2nd season)
- Conference: Ivy
- Location: Philadelphia, Pennsylvania, US
- Stadium: Rhodes Field (capacity: 1,000)
- Nickname: Quakers
- Colors: Red and blue
Home	Away

Pre-tournament ISFA/ISFL championships
- 1914, 1916, 1919, 1920, 1923, 1924, 1930, 1931, 1932, 1933

NCAA tournament Quarterfinals
- 1969, 1972, 1973

NCAA tournament Round of 16
- 1969, 1972, 1973, 1977

NCAA tournament appearances
- 1969, 1970, 1971, 1972, 1973, 1977, 2002, 2008, 2010, 2013, 2022, 2024

Conference Regular Season championships
- 1955, 1962, 1971, 1972, 1980, 2002, 2008, 2013, 2022, 2023

The Penn Quakers men's soccer team is an intercollegiate varsity sports team of the University of Pennsylvania. The team is a member of the Ivy League of the National Collegiate Athletic Association.

== Roster ==
As of Sep 17, 2024

Note: Flags indicate national team as defined under FIFA eligibility rules; some limited exceptions apply. Players may hold more than one non-FIFA nationality.

No.	Pos.	Nation	Player
1	GK	USA	Phillip Falcon III
3	DF	USA	Oliver Pratt
4	MF	USA	Gavin Seele
5	DF	USA	Joaquin Niehenke
6	MF	USA	Aaron Messer
8	MF	USA	Jack-Ryan Jeremiah
9	FW	USA	Stas Korzeniowski
10	DF	USA	Ben Do
12	FW	USA	Jack Wagoner
13	MF	USA	Erickson Sakalosky
14	DF	USA	Malachi Neal
15	MF	USA	Marco Bottene
16	FW	USA	Romeo Dahlen

No.	Pos.	Nation	Player
18	MF	USA	Mathis Varin
19	MF	USA	Pierce Wagner
20	DF	USA	Connor Dawson
21	DF	USA	Nik Kathiresan
24	DF	USA	Sean Jennings
25	GK	USA	Aidan Coffey
26	MF	USA	Brandon Curran
28	FW	USA	Tim Shine
29	MF	USA	Aiden Frick
30	GK	USA	David Howard
31	MF	USA	Patrick Cayelli
32	FW	USA	Carter Haynes
33	FW	USA	Adam Kuechler

== Notable alumni ==
- (United States) Mike Constantino
- (United States) Santiago Formoso
- (United States) James Gentle
- (United States) Seth Roland

== Honours ==
- Ivy League tournament
  - Champions (10): 1955, 1962, 1971, 1972, 1980, 2002, 2008, 2013, 2022, 2023
- Intercollegiate Soccer Football Association Championship
  - Winners (10): 1914, 1916, 1919, 1920, 1923, 1924, 1930, 1931, 1932, 1933

== See also ==
- Penn Quakers
