= Ivy League Men's Soccer Player of the Year =

The Ivy League Men's Soccer Player of the Year is an annual award presented by the Ivy League to the best offensive and defensive player in the conference. From 1979 until 2012 there was one award presented. Starting in 2013, two awards were presented: the offensive and defensive players of the year.

== Key ==
†	Co-Players of the Year
*	Awarded a national Player of the Year award: Hermann Trophy; TDS Player of the Year; SA Player of the Year
Player (X)	Denotes the number of times the player had been awarded the Ivy Player of the Year award at that point

== Winners ==
=== Player of the Year (1979–2012) ===
Season	Nat.	Player	Pos.	School	Class	Reference
1979	ENG	Steve Charles	MF	Columbia	Fr.	
1980	ENG	Barry Nix	DF	Columbia	Jr.	
1981	ENG	Barry Nix (2)	DF	Columbia	Sr.	
1982	GRE	Steve Sirtis	FW	Columbia	So.	
1983	GRE	Steve Sirtis (2)	MF	Columbia	Jr.	
1984	JAM	Solomon Gayle	FW	Columbia		
1985	ENG	Neil Banks	DF	Columbia		
1986	USA	Jeff Duback	GK	Yale		
1987	JAM	Kingsley Chin	FW	Columbia		
1988		Doug MacGinnitie	FW	Dartmouth		
1989		Peter Zenobi	DF	Yale		
1990		Jim Barlow	MF	Princeton		
1991	ITA	Peter DiMaggio	MF	Columbia		
1992		Justin Head	MF	Dartmouth		
1993	ISL	Rikki Dadason	FW	Columbia		
1994	ENG	Darren Eales	FW	Brown		
1995	CAN	Gary Hughes	FW	Brown		
1996	USA	Will Kohler	FW	Harvard		
1997	USA	Tom McLaughlin	FW	Harvard		
1998		Jac Gould	FW	Yale		
1999		Marcio	FW	Brown		
2000	USA	Cory Gibbs	DF	Brown	Jr.	
2001	USA	Mike Nugent	FW	Princeton		
2002		Matt Haefner	GK	Penn		
2003		Adom Crew	FW	Brown		
2004	USA	Darren Spicer	MF	Princeton	Jr.	
2005		Charles Altchek	FW	Harvard		
2006		Charles Altchek (2)	FW	Harvard		
2007		Matthew Britner	DF	Brown		
2008	NZL	Craig Henderson	FW	Dartmouth	Jr.	
2009	USA	Andre Akpan	FW	Harvard	Sr.	
2010	FRA	Antoine Hoppenot	FW	Princeton	Jr.	
2011	ZIM	Lucky Mkosana	FW	Dartmouth	Sr.	
2012	CAN	Daniel Haber	FW	Cornell	Jr.	

=== Offensive Player of the Year (2013–) ===
Season	Nat.	Player	School	Class	Reference
2013	USA	Duke Lacroix	Penn	Jr.	
2014	USA	Cameron Porter	Princeton	Sr.	
2015	USA	Thomas Sanner	Princeton	Sr.	
2016	RSA	Arthur Bosua	Columbia	Jr.	
2017	RSA	Arthur Bosua (2)	Columbia	Sr.	
2018	USA	Kevin O'Toole	Princeton	So.	
2019	PHI	Mark Winhoffer	Yale	Jr.	
2021	USA	Kevin O'Toole (2)	Princeton	Sr.	
2022	USA	Stas Korzeniowski	Penn	So.	
2023	ITA	Alessandro Arlotti	Harvard	Sr.	
2024	USA	Alex Harris	Cornell	So.	
2025	USA	Daniel Ittycheria	Princeton	Sr.	
2026	USA	Connor Miller	Cornell	Sr.	

=== Defensive Player of the Year (2013–) ===
Season	Nat.	Player	School	Class	Reference
2013	USA	Patrick Slogic	Cornell	Sr.	
2014	USA	Mark Ashby	Harvard	Jr.	
2015	USA	Stefan Cleveland	Dartmouth	Jr.	
2016	USA	Wyatt Omsberg	Dartmouth	Jr.	
2017	USA	Wyatt Omsberg (2)	Dartmouth	Sr.	
2018	USA	Dylan Castanheira	Columbia	Sr.	
2019	ENG	Alex Touche	Penn	Jr.	
2021	USA	Elian Haddock	Yale	Jr.	
2022	USA	Leo Burney	Penn	So.	
2023	USA	TJ Presthus	Yale	Jr.	
2024	USA	Leo Burney	Penn	Sr.	
2025	USA	Andrew Samuels	Princeton	Jr.	
2026	USA	Connor Dawson	Penn	Sr.	
