= 2017 Ivy League men's soccer season =

- League: NCAA Division I
- Sport: Soccer
- Duration: August, 2017 – November, 2017
- Teams: 8

2018 MLS SuperDraft
- Top draft pick: Wyatt Omsberg, Dartmouth
- Picked by: Minnesota United FC, 15th overall

Regular Season
- Champions: Dartmouth
- Runners-up: Columbia
- Season MVP: Offensive: Arthur Bosua; Defensive: Wyatt Omsberg
- Top scorer: Arthur Bosua (12)

Ivy League men's soccer seasons
- ← 2016 2018 →

2017 Ivy League men's soccer standings
	Conf.					Overall
Team	W		L		T	W		L		T
No. 23 Dartmouth ‡	6	–	0	–	1	12	–	3	–	2
No. 25 Columbia +	5	–	1	–	1	12	–	3	–	3
Brown	2	–	3	–	2	8	–	6	–	3
Princeton	2	–	3	–	2	6	–	7	–	4
Yale	2	–	3	–	2	5	–	9	–	2
Cornell	2	–	4	–	1	7	–	8	–	2
Penn	2	–	4	–	1	4	–	12	–	1
Harvard	1	–	4	–	2	2	–	10	–	4
‡ – Conference champion + – Invited to the 2017 NCAA Division I Men's Soccer Championship; As of December 13, 2017; Rankings from United Soccer Coaches

The 2017 Ivy League men's soccer season was the 63rd season of men's varsity soccer in the conference. The Dartmouth Big Green entered the 2017 season as returning league champions, with hopes to claim the Ivy League title again for a fourth consecutive season. The Big Green became Ivy League champions after a 1-0 win against Cornell on November 6, 2017, clinching the Ivy League title for the fourth consecutive season.

== Stadiums and locations ==
Team	Location	Stadium	Capacity
Brown Bears	Providence, Rhode Island	Stevenson Field	3,500
Columbia Lions	New York City, New York	Rocco B. Commisso Soccer Stadium	3,500
Cornell Big Red	Ithaca, New York	Berman Field	1,000
Dartmouth Big Green	Hanover, New Hampshire	Burnham Field	1,600
Harvard Crimson	Cambridge, Massachusetts	Jordan Field	2,500
Penn Quakers	Philadelphia, Pennsylvania	Rhodes Field	2,000
Princeton Tigers	Princeton, New Jersey	Roberts Stadium	1,750
Yale Bulldogs	New Haven, Connecticut	Reese Stadium	3,000

== Regular season ==
=== Results ===
Team/Opponent	BRO	COL	COR	DAR	HAR	PEN	PRI	YAL
Brown Bears								
Columbia Lions								
Cornell Big Red								
Dartmouth Big Green								
Harvard Crimson								
Penn Quakers								
Princeton Tigers								
Yale Bulldogs								

=== Rankings ===
Legend
Increase in ranking
Decrease in ranking
Not ranked previous week

		Pre	Wk 1	Wk 2	Wk 3	Wk 4	Wk 5	Wk 6	Wk 7	Wk 8	Wk 9	Wk 10	Wk 11	Wk 12	Final
Brown	C														
Columbia	C						23	14	22	RV	RV	RV	25	RV	25
Cornell	C														
Dartmouth	C		RV				RV	RV	RV	20	20	19	19	17	23
Harvard	C														
Penn	C														
Princeton	C														
Yale	C														

== Postseason ==
=== NCAA Tournament ===
Seed	Region	School	1st Round	2nd Round	3rd Round	Quarterfinals	Semifinals	Championship
15	4	Dartmouth	BYE	T, 0–0 ^{L, 1–4 pen.} vs. UNH – (Dartmouth)				
N/A	1	Columbia	W 2–1 (2OT) vs. William & Mary – (William & Mary)	L, 0–1 vs. Wake Forest – (Wake Forest)				

== All-Ivy League awards and teams ==
2017 Ivy League Men's Soccer Individual Awards
Award	Recipient(s)
Offensive Player of the Year	Arthur Bosua, Columbia
Defensive Player of the Year	Wyatt Omsberg, Dartmouth
Coach of the Year	Chad Riley, Dartmouth
Freshman of the Year	Dawson McCartney, Dartmouth

First team

Note: Flags indicate national team as defined under FIFA eligibility rules; some limited exceptions apply. Players may hold more than one non-FIFA nationality.

No.	Pos.	Nation	Player
1	GK	USA	Dylan Castanheira (Columbia)
2	DF	USA	Jack Hagstrom (Brown)
3	DF	GER	Alex Bangerl (Columbia)
4	DF	USA	Wyatt Omsberg (Dartmouth)
5	DF	USA	Sam Wancowicz (Penn)
6	MF	USA	John Denis (Columbia)
7	MF	USA	Matt Danilack (Dartmouth)
8	MF	BER	Justin Donawa (Dartmouth)
9	MF	USA	Quinn English (Brown)
10	MF	USA	Tyler Dowse (Dartmouth)
11	MF	CAN	Vana Markarian (Columbia)
12	FW	USA	Arthur Bosua (Columbia)
13	FW	USA	Eduvie Ikoba (Dartmouth)

Second team

Note: Flags indicate national team as defined under FIFA eligibility rules; some limited exceptions apply. Players may hold more than one non-FIFA nationality.

No.	Pos.	Nation	Player
—	GK	USA	Chris Palacios (Dartmouth)
—	DF	USA	Louis Zingas (Brown)
—	DF	USA	Richie Hrncir (Cornell)
—	DF	USA	Alex Touche (Cornell)
—	DF	USA	Blake Willis (Columbia)
—	DF	USA	Richard Wolf (Princeton)
—	MF	USA	Joe Swenson (Penn)
—	MF	USA	Noah Paravicini (Dartmouth)
—	MF	USA	Christian Sady (Harvard)
—	FW	USA	Kyle Kenagy (Yale)
—	FW	USA	Jake Kohlbrenner (Penn)
—	FW	USA	Jeremy Colvin (Princeton)

Honorable Mention

Note: Flags indicate national team as defined under FIFA eligibility rules; some limited exceptions apply. Players may hold more than one non-FIFA nationality.

No.	Pos.	Nation	Player
—	GK	USA	Jacob Schachner (Princeton)
—	DF	USA	Cameron Riach (Yale)
—	DF	USA	Henry Martin (Princeton)
—	MF	USA	James Myall (Brown)
—	MF	USA	Nico Lozada (Brown)
—	MF	USA	Matt Mangini (Princeton)
—	MF	USA	Archie Kinnane (Yale)
—	MF	USA	Tommy Hansan (Cornell)
—	MF	USA	Sebastian Lindner-Liaw (Harvard)
—	MF	USA	Dawson McCartney (Dartmouth)
—	MF	USA	Danny Laranetto (Columbia)
—	MF	USA	Miguel Yuste (Yale)

== See also ==
- 2017 NCAA Division I men's soccer season
