= 2016 Ivy League men's soccer season =

- League: NCAA Division I
- Sport: Soccer
- Duration: August, 2016 – November, 2016
- Teams: 10

2017 MLS SuperDraft
- Top draft pick: Andrew Wheeler-Omiunu, Harvard
- Picked by: Atlanta United FC, 46th overall

Regular season
- Co-champions: Columbia; Dartmouth
- Season MVP: Offensive: Arthur Bosua; Defensive: Wyatt Omsberg

Ivy League men's soccer seasons
- ← 2015 2017 →

2016 Ivy League men's soccer standings
	Conf.					Overall
Team	W		L		T	W		L		T
Columbia ‡x	5	–	1	–	1	12	–	3	–	1
Dartmouth ‡	5	–	1	–	1	8	–	5	–	5
Brown	3	–	3	–	1	8	–	8	–	1
Penn	3	–	3	–	1	5	–	5	–	6
Princeton	1	–	3	–	2	7	–	7	–	2
Yale	1	–	4	–	2	3	–	10	–	2
Cornell	0	–	6	–	0	1	–	13	–	2
Harvard #	4	–	0	–	1	10	–	3	–	2
‡-Conference champion x- Not invited to the NCAA Division I Men's Soccer Championship #- Ineligible (self-imposed sanctions); As of 21 November 2016; Rankings from NSCAA

The 2016 Ivy League men's soccer season was the 62nd season of men's varsity soccer in the conference.

The Dartmouth Big Green are the defending champions, by virtue of winning the regular season (there is no conference tournament).

== Changes from 2015 ==
- None

== Teams ==
=== Stadiums and locations ===
Team	Location	Stadium	Capacity
Brown Bears	Providence, Rhode Island	Stevenson Field	3,500
Columbia Lions	New York City, New York	Columbia Soccer Stadium	3,500
Cornell Big Red	Ithaca, New York	Berman Field	1,000
Dartmouth Big Green	Hanover, New Hampshire	Burnham Field	1,600
Harvard Crimson	Cambridge, Massachusetts	Soldiers Field Soccer Stadium	2,500
Penn Quakers	Philadelphia, Pennsylvania	Rhodes Field	2,000
Princeton Tigers	Princeton, New Jersey	Roberts Stadium	1,750
Yale Bulldogs	New Haven, Connecticut	Reese Stadium	3,000

== Regular season ==
=== Results ===
Team/opponent	BRO	COL	COR	DAR	HAR	PEN	PRI	YAL
Brown Bears								
Columbia Lions								
Cornell Big Red								
Dartmouth Big Green								
Harvard Crimson								
Penn Quakers								
Princeton Tigers								
Yale Bulldogs								

=== Rankings ===
Legend
Increase in ranking
Decrease in ranking
Not ranked previous week

		Pre	Wk 1	Wk 2	Wk 3	Wk 4	Wk 5	Wk 6	Wk 7	Wk 8	Wk 9	Wk 10	Wk 11	Wk 12	Final
Brown	C				RV	NR									
Columbia	C														
Cornell	C														
Dartmouth	C	RV	RV	RV	RV	NR					RV	RV	RV	RV	RV
Harvard	C	RV	NR												
Penn	C														
Princeton	C														
Yale	C														

== Postseason ==
=== NCAA tournament ===
Seed	Region	School	1st round	2nd round	3rd round	Quarterfinals	Semifinals	Championship
—	College Park	Dartmouth	W 2–1 ^{OT} vs. St. Francis Brooklyn – (Durham)	L, 0–3 vs. #8 Syracuse – (Syracuse)				

== All-Ivy League awards and teams ==
2016 Ivy League Men's Soccer Individual Awards
Award	Recipient(s)
Offensive Player of the Year	Arthur Bosua, Columbia
Defensive Player of the Year	Wyatt Omsberg, Dartmouth
Coach of the Year	Kevin Anderson, Columbia
Freshman of the Year	Vana Markarian, Columbia

First team

Note: Flags indicate national team as defined under FIFA eligibility rules; some limited exceptions apply. Players may hold more than one non-FIFA nationality.

No.	Pos.	Nation	Player
1	GK	USA	James Hickok (Dartmouth)
2	DF	USA	Jack Hagstrom (Brown)
3	DF	GER	Alex Bangerl (Columbia)
4	DF	USA	Wyatt Omsberg (Dartmouth)
5	DF	USA	Patrick Barba (Princeton)
6	MF	USA	Andrew Tinari (Columbia)
7	MF	USA	Matt Danilack (Dartmouth)
8	MF	USA	Matt Poplawski (Penn)
9	FW	USA	Arthur Bosua (Columbia)
10	FW	USA	Greg Seifert (Princeton)
11	FW	USA	Alec Neumann (Penn)

Second team

Note: Flags indicate national team as defined under FIFA eligibility rules; some limited exceptions apply. Players may hold more than one non-FIFA nationality.

No.	Pos.	Nation	Player
—	GK	USA	Dylan Castenheria (Columbia)
—	DF	USA	Louis Zingas (Brown)
—	DF	USA	Sam Wancowicz (Penn)
—	DF	USA	Henry Flugstad-Clarke (Yale)
—	DF	IRN	Vana Markarian (Columbia)
—	MF	IRL	Sean McSherry (Princeton)
—	MF	USA	Noah Paravicini (Dartmouth)
—	MF	USA	Nicky Downs (Yale)
—	FW	CAN	Matthew Chow (Brown)
—	FW	ENG	George Pedlow (Cornell)
—	FW	NGA	Dami Omitaomu (Penn)

Third team

Note: Flags indicate national team as defined under FIFA eligibility rules; some limited exceptions apply. Players may hold more than one non-FIFA nationality.

No.	Pos.	Nation	Player
—	GK	USA	Erik Hanson (Brown)
—	DF	USA	Ricardo Gomez (Dartmouth)
—	DF	USA	Tyler Dowse (Dartmouth)
—	DF	USA	Mark Romanowski (Princeton)
—	DF	USA	Nico Lozada (Brown)
—	MF	USA	Matt Greer (Penn)
—	MF	BER	Justin Donawa (Dartmouth)
—	MF	USA	Ryan Watters (Cornell)
—	MF	USA	Joe Swenson (Penn)
—	FW	USA	Nate Pomeroy (Brown)

== See also ==
- 2016 NCAA Division I men's soccer season
- 2016 Ivy League women's soccer season
