= 2024 Ivy League men's soccer tournament =

- Classification: Division I
- Teams: 4
- Matches: 3
- Attendance: 1,852
- Site: Rhodes Field; Philadelphia, Pennsylvania
- Champions: Princeton (1st title)
- Winning coach: Jim Barlow (1st title)
- MVP: Daniel Ittycheria (Princeton)
- Broadcast: ESPN+

2024 Ivy League men's soccer standings
	Conf.					Overall
Team	W		L		T	W		L		T
No. 19 Penn +	7	–	0	–	0	15	–	4	–	1
No. 22 Cornell +	5	–	2	–	0	13	–	4	–	2
Princeton ‡	5	–	2	–	0	12	–	7	–	0
Brown	3	–	4	–	0	8	–	8	–	1
Harvard	3	–	4	–	0	4	–	7	–	4
Dartmouth	2	–	4	–	1	5	–	8	–	3
Columbia	1	–	5	–	1	1	–	12	–	1
Yale	1	–	6	–	0	4	–	11	–	1
‡ – 2024 Ivy League tournament champion + – At-large invitation to the 2024 NCAA tournament; As of December 17, 2024; Rankings from United Soccer Coaches; Source: Ivy League

The 2024 Ivy League men's soccer tournament was the postseason men's soccer tournament for the Ivy League held from November 15 through November 17, 2024. The tournament was at Rhodes Field in Philadelphia, Pennsylvania, home of the regular season champions, Penn. The four team-team single-elimination tournament consisted of two rounds based on seeding from regular season conference play. The Yale Bulldogs were the defending champions. They were unable to defend their title, as they did not qualify for the tournament, finishing in last place in the regular season. Third seed Princeton won the title by defeating Penn 3–1 in the Final. The conference tournament title was the first for the Princeton men's soccer program, and the first for head coach Jim Barlow. Princeton had previously won ten regular season men's soccer titles before the Ivy League Tournament was created. As tournament champions, Princeton earned the Ivy League's automatic berth into the 2024 NCAA Division I men's soccer tournament.

== Seeding ==
The top four teams in the regular season earned a spot in the 2024 tournament and teams were seeded by conference record. All games were hosted by the number one seed. A tiebreaker was required to determine the second and third seeds as Cornell and Princeton finished with identical 5–2–0 regular season records. Cornell defeated Princeton 1–0 during the regular season, on October 12, to earn the second seed. A second tiebreaker was required to determine the fourth and final seed in the tournament as Brown and Harvard finished with identical 3–4–0 regular season records. Brown defeated Harvard 3–1 during the regular season, on October 19, to earn the fourth and final seed in the tournament.

Seed	School	Conference Record	Points
1	Penn	7–0–0	21
2	Cornell	5–2–0	15
3	Princeton	5–2–0	15
4	Brown	3–4–0	9

== Bracket ==
Semifinals; Friday, Nov. 15
1	Penn (a.e.t)	2
4	Brown	1
2	Cornell	2
3	Princeton (a.e.t)	3

Final; Sunday, Nov. 17
1	Penn	1
3	Princeton	3

== Schedule ==
=== Semifinals ===
November 15, 2024	#1 Penn	2–1 (a.e.t.)	#4 Brown	Philadelphia, PA
3:00 p.m. EST	Jack-Ryan Jeremiah 51' (pen.); Oliver Pratt (yellow card) 82', 94'	Report	25' Jack Cloherty	Stadium: Rhodes Field; Attendance: 500; Referee: Cedric Cook; Assistant referees: Matt Richardson; Ricardo Barreto; Fourth official: Erick Backstrom

November 15, 2024	#2 Cornell	2–3 (a.e.t.)	#3 Princeton	Philadelphia, PA
6:30 p.m. EST	Alex Harris 15'; Danny Lokko 18'; Dominik Kolbl (yellow card) 82'; Liam May (yellow card) 83'; Kisa Kiingi (yellow card) 96'	Report	(yellow card) 18', (goal) 83' Nico Nee; 22', 104' Daniel Ittycheria	Stadium: Rhodes Field; Attendance: 200; Referee: Greg DeMello; Assistant referees: Jurii Siskin; Kyle O'Grady; Fourth official: Larry Urwiler

=== Final ===
November 17, 2024	#1 Penn	1–3	#3 Princeton	Philadelphia, PA
1:00 p.m. EST	Leo Burney (yellow card) 9', (goal) 84'; Jack-Ryan Jeremiah (yellow card) 56'; Stas Korzeniowski (yellow card) 75'	Report	9' Nico Nee; (yellow card) 25' Sam Vigilante; (yellow card) 45' Harry Roberts; 62' Ian Nunez; (yellow card) 72' Dash Papez; 76' Daniel Ittycheria	Stadium: Rhodes Field; Attendance: 1,152; Referee: Carlos Fernandes; Assistant referees: Bill Guarini; Brendan Quinn; Fourth official: David Allan

== Statistics ==
=== Goalscorers ===
There were 12 goals scored in 3 matches, for an average of 4 goals per match (as of November 17, 2023).

3 goals

- Daniel Ittycheria – Princeton

2 goals

- Nico Nee – Princeton

1 goal

- Leo Burney – Penn
- Jack Cloherty – Brown
- Alex Harris – Cornell
- Jack-Ryan Jeremiah – Penn
- Dominik Kolbl – Cornell
- Ian Nunez – Princeton
- Oliver Pratt – Penn

== All-Tournament team ==
Player	Team
Jack Cloherty	Brown
Mads Stistrup Petersen	Brown
Alex Harris	Cornell
Liam May	Cornell
Leo Burney	Penn
Jack-Ryan Jeremiah	Penn
Oliver Pratt	Penn
**Daniel Ittycheria**	Princeton
Jack Jasinski	Princeton
Nico Nee	Princeton
Giuliano Whitchurch	Princeton

MVP in bold
