= 2023 Ivy League men's soccer tournament =

- Classification: Division I
- Teams: 4
- Matches: 3
- Attendance: 600
- Site: Rhodes Field; Philadelphia, Pennsylvania
- Champions: Yale (1st title)
- Winning coach: Kylie Stannard (1st title)
- MVP: Eric Lagos (Yale)
- Broadcast: ESPN+

2023 Ivy League men's soccer standings
	Conf.					Overall
Team	W		L		T	W		L		T
Penn	4	–	1	–	2	7	–	3	–	6
Yale ‡	3	–	1	–	3	11	–	6	–	3
Harvard	3	–	1	–	3	5	–	5	–	7
Brown	2	–	0	–	5	5	–	5	–	8
Cornell	2	–	2	–	3	8	–	4	–	3
Dartmouth	2	–	3	–	2	4	–	8	–	3
Princeton	1	–	4	–	2	4	–	8	–	3
Columbia	0	–	5	–	2	2	–	8	–	4
‡ – 2023 Ivy League tournament champion + – At-large invitation to the 2023 NCAA tournament; As of December 12, 2023; Rankings from United Soccer Coaches; Source: Ivy League

The 2023 Ivy League men's soccer tournament was the inaugural postseason men's soccer tournament for the Ivy League held from November 10 through November 12, 2023. The tournament was hosted by Rhodes Field in Philadelphia, Pennsylvania, home of the regular season champions, Penn. The four team-team single-elimination tournament consisted of two rounds based on seeding from regular season conference play. Third seeded Yale became the first team to win the championship by defeating Brown 2–1 in the Final. The conference tournament title was the first for the Yale men's soccer program, and the first for head coach Kylie Stannard. Yale had previously won six regular season men's soccer titles before the Ivy League Tournament was created. As tournament champions, Yale earned the Ivy League's automatic berth into the 2023 NCAA Division I men's soccer tournament.

== Seeding ==
The top four teams in the regular season earned a spot in the tournament and teams were seeded by conference record. A tiebreaker was required as both Harvard and Yale finished the regular season tied with 3–1–3 records. Harvard defeated Yale 3–1 on October 14 during the regular season. Therefore, Harvard earned the second seed in the tournament while Yale was the third seed.

Seed	School	Conference Record	Points
1	Penn	4–1–2	14
2	Harvard	3–1–3	12
3	Yale	3–1–3	12
4	Brown	2–0–5	11

== Bracket ==
Semifinals; Friday, Nov. 10
1	Penn	2 (2)
4	Brown (pen.)	2 (3)
2	Harvard	0
3	Yale	4

Final; Sunday, Nov. 12
4	Brown	1
3	Yale	2

== Schedule ==
=== Semifinals ===
November 10	#2 Harvard	0–4	#3 Yale	Philadelphia, PA
3:00 p.m. ET	Andreas Savva (yellow card) 18'	Report	23', 56', (yellow card) 63' Eric Lagos; 59' Quanah Brayboy; (yellow card) 76' Ryan Cote; 78' Jamie Orson	Stadium: Rhodes Field; Attendance: 100; Referee: Karl Kummer; Assistant referees: Dustin Killick; Matthew Richardson

November 10	#1 Penn	2–2 (a.e.t.) (2–3 p)	#4 Brown	Philadelphia, PA
6:30 p.m. ET	Leo Burney 71'; Oliver Pratt (yellow card) 79'; Stas Korzeniowski 103'	Report	(yellow card) 43' Jack Cloherty; 88', (yellow card) 89' Levi Pillar; 98' Scott Gustafson	Stadium: Rhodes Field; Attendance: 300; Referee: Andrea Pileri; Assistant referees: Randy Vonsteuben; Hector Rueda
	Penalties
	Michael Hewes (penalty scored); Mateo Zazueta (penalty missed); Jacob Muchnick (penalty scored); Leo Burney (penalty missed); Aaron Messer (penalty missed)		(penalty scored) Kojo Dadzie; (penalty missed) Levi Pillar; (penalty scored) Langdon Gryglas; (penalty scored) Lorenzo Amaral

=== Final ===
November 12	#3 Yale	2–1	#4 Brown	Philadelphia, PA
1:00 p.m. ET	Jonathan Seidman (yellow card) 66'; Ryan Cote 68'; Eric Lagos 72'	Report	(yellow card) 32' Tanner Barry; (yellow card) 32' Jamin Gogo Peters; 76' Harri Sprofera; (yellow card) 78' Jack Cloherty	Stadium: Rhodes Field; Attendance: 200; Referee: John McCloskey; Assistant referees: Kyle Radziewicz; Conor McCloskey

== Statistics ==
=== Goalscorers ===
There were 11 goals scored in 3 matches, for an average of 3.67 goals per match (as of November 12, 2023).

3 goals

- Eric Lagos – Yale

1 goal

- Scott Gustafson – Brown
- Levi Pillar – Brown
- Harri Sprofera – Brown
- Leo Burney – Penn
- Stas Korzeniowski – Penn
- Quanah Brayboy – Yale
- Ryan Cote – Yale
- Jamie Orson – Yale

== All-Tournament team ==
Player	Team
Hudson Blatteis	Brown
Kojo Dadzie	Brown
Harri Sprofera	Brown
Alessandro Arlotti	Harvard
Jan Riecke	Harvard
Leo Burney	Penn
Stas Korzeniowski	Penn
**Eric Lagos**	Yale
TJ Presthus	Yale
Max Rogers	Yale
Jonathan Seidman	Yale

MVP in bold
