= Ivy League men's soccer tournament =

Collegiate soccer tournament first held in 2023

- Conference soccer championship
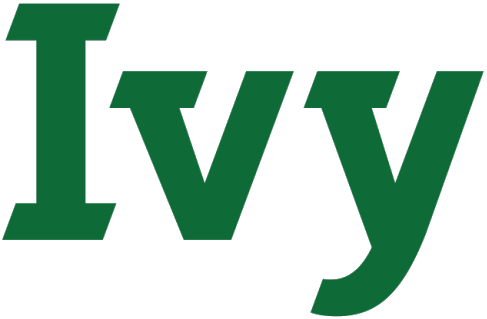
- Sport: College soccer
- Conference: Ivy League
- Number of teams: 4
- Format: Single-elimination
- Current stadium: Charles F. Berman Field
- Current location: Ithaca, NY
- Played: 2023–present
- Last contest: 2026
- Current champion: Cornell (1st title)
- Most championships: Princeton (2 titles)
- TV partner: ESPN+
- Official website: ivyleauge.com/msoc

The Ivy League men's soccer tournament is the conference championship tournament in soccer for the Ivy League. The inaugural tournament was held in 2023. It is a single-elimination tournament and seeding is based on regular season records.

The team with the best regular season record continues to be named Ivy League champion while the tournament winner earns league's automatic bid to the NCAA Championship.

Princeton is the most winning team with two championships won.

== Champions ==
=== Tournament ===
Although the team with the best season record continues to be named Ivy champion, the four best placed teams qualify to a single-elimination tournament which winner earns a bid to the NCAA Championship.

Keys
- (1) Title number
- a.e.t. – Match went to extra time
- p – Match decided by a penalty shootout after extra time
- – Winning team won regular season

Ed.	Year	Champion	Score	Runner-up	Venue	City	MVP	Ref.
1	2023	Yale (1)	2–1	Brown	Rhodes Field	Philadelphia, PA	Eric Lagos (Yale)	
2	2024	Princeton (1)	3–1	Penn	Rhodes Field	Philadelphia, PA	Daniel Ittycheria (Princeton)	
3	2025	Princeton (2)	2–0	Cornell	Roberts Stadium	Princeton, NJ	Andrew Samuels (Princeton)	
4	2026	Cornell (1)	2–0	Penn	Charles F. Berman Field	Ithaca, NY	Connor Miller (Cornell)	

=== By school ===
School	Apps.	Wins	L	T	Win %	Finals	Titles	Winning Years
Brown	2	1	2	0	.333	1	0	—
Columbia	0	0	0	0	–	0	0	—
Cornell	3	3	2	0	.600	2	1	2026
Dartmouth	0	0	0	0	–	0	0	—
Harvard	3	0	3	0	.000	0	0	—
Penn	4	2	4	0	.333	2	0	—
Princeton	2	4	0	0	1.000	2	2	2024, 2025
Yale	2	2	1	0	.667	1	1	2023

== Regular season ==
=== Champions ===
Ed.	Year	Champion/s
1	1955	Harvard (1) (Note: Title shared.)
1	1955	Penn (1)
2	1956	Yale (1)
3	1957	Princeton (1)
4	1958	Harvard (2)
5	1959	Harvard (3)
6	1960	Princeton (2)
7	1961	Harvard (4)
8	1962	Penn (2)
8	1962	Harvard (5)
9	1963	Brown (1)
9	1963	Harvard (6)
10	1964	Brown (2)
10	1964	Dartmouth (1)
11	1965	Brown (3)
12	1966	Brown (4)
13	1967	Brown (5)
14	1968	Brown (6)
15	1969	Harvard (7)
16	1970	Harvard (8)
17	1971	Penn (3)
18	1972	Penn (4)
19	1973	Brown (7)
20	1974	Brown (8)
21	1975	Brown (9)
21	1975	Cornell (1)
22	1976	Brown (10)
23	1977	Cornell (2)
24	1978	Columbia (1)
25	1979	Columbia (2)
26	1980	Columbia (3)
26	1980	Penn (5)
27	1981	Columbia (4)

Ed.	Year	Champion/s
28	1982	Columbia (5)
29	1983	Columbia (6)
30	1984	Columbia (7)
31	1985	Columbia (8)
32	1986	Yale (2)
33	1987	Harvard (9)
34	1988	Dartmouth (2)
34	1988	Princeton (3)
35	1989	Yale (3)
36	1990	Dartmouth (3)
37	1991	Yale (4)
38	1992	Dartmouth (4)
39	1993	Columbia (9)
39	1993	Princeton (4)
40	1994	Brown (5)
40	1994	Harvard (10)
41	1995	Cornell (3)
41	1995	Brown (11)
42	1996	Harvard (10)
43	1997	Brown (12)
44	1998	Brown (13)
45	1999	Princeton (5)
46	2000	Brown (14)
47	2001	Brown (15)
47	2001	Princeton (6)
48	2002	Penn (6)
48	2002	Dartmouth (5)
49	2003	Brown (15)
50	2004	Dartmouth (6)
51	2005	Brown (16)
51	2005	Dartmouth (7)
51	2005	Yale (5)

Ed.	Year	Champion/s
52	2006	Harvard (11)
53	2007	Brown (17)
54	2008	Dartmouth (8)
54	2008	Penn (7)
55	2009	Harvard (12)
56	2010	Princeton (7)
57	2011	Brown (18)
57	2011	Dartmouth (9)
58	2012	Cornell (4)
59	2013	Penn (8)
60	2014	Princeton (8)
60	2014	Dartmouth (10)
61	2015	Dartmouth (11)
62	2016	Dartmouth (12)
62	2016	Columbia (10)
63	2017	Dartmouth (13)
64	2018	Princeton (9)
65	2019	Yale (6)
–	2020	(Not held) (Note: Because of the COVID-19 pandemic in the United States.)
66	2021	Princeton (10)
67	2022	Penn (9)
68	2023	Penn (10)
69	2024	Penn (11)
70	2025	Princeton (11)
71	2026	Cornell (5)

=== Titles by team ===
Team	Titles	Winning years
Brown	20	1963, 1964, 1965, 1966, 1967, 1968, 1973, 1974, 1975, 1976, 1994, 1995, 1997, 1998, 2000, 2001, 2003, 2004, 2007, 2011
Harvard	13	1955, 1958, 1959, 1961, 1962, 1963, 1969, 1970, 1987, 1994, 1996, 2006, 2009
Dartmouth	13	1964, 1988, 1990, 1992, 2002, 2004, 2005, 2008, 2011, 2014, 2015, 2016, 2017
Penn	11	1955, 1962, 1971, 1972, 1980, 2002, 2008, 2013, 2022, 2023, 2024
Princeton	11	1957, 1960, 1988, 1993, 1999, 2001, 2010, 2014, 2018, 2021, 2025
Columbia	10	1978, 1979, 1980, 1981, 1982, 1983, 1984, 1985, 1993, 2016
Yale	6	1956, 1986, 1989, 1991, 2005, 2019
Cornell	5	1975, 1977, 1995, 2012, 2026
