= 1870s in American soccer =

Notable events in American soccer during the 1870s.

== 1870 ==
=== International matches ===
No international matches were played during the 1870 calendar year.

=== Club matches ===
The following are known American soccer club matches that were played in 1870.

Date	Competition	Team 1	Score	Team 2	Stadium	Location	Ref.
January 30, 1870	Friendly	(New York (state)) Adelphi Academy	Unknown				
October 11, 1870	Friendly	(New Jersey) Rutgers 1874	1–6	(New Jersey) Rutgers 1873	College Field	New Brunswick, New Jersey	
October 31, 1870	Friendly	(Connecticut) Yale 1872	0–0	(Connecticut) Yale 1873	The Green	Hanover, New Hampshire	
November 2, 1870	Friendly	(New Hampshire) Dartmouth 1874	L–W	(New Hampshire) Dartmouth 1873	The Green	Hanover, New Hampshire	
November 5, 1870	Friendly	(New Hampshire) Dartmouth 1874	L–W	(New Hampshire) Dartmouth 1873	The Green	Hanover, New Hampshire	
November 12, 1870	Friendly	(New York (state)) Columbia University	3–6	(New Jersey) Rutgers University	College Field	New Brunswick, New Jersey	
November 13, 1870	Friendly	(Connecticut) Yale 1872	2–0	(Connecticut) Yale 1873	Lake Place	New Haven, Connecticut	

Source: SoccerStats.us
