= 1871–72 College of New Jersey Tigers men's soccer team =

American college soccer season

1871–72 College of New Jersey Tigers men's soccer

National champions (ASHA/IFRA)
- Conference: Independent
- Record: 1–0–0
- Head coach: Unknown

1871–72 college soccer records
| | Conf. | | | Overall |
| Team | W | L | T | W | | L | | T |
|---|---|---|---|---|---|---|---|---|
| College of New Jersey | | – | | 1 | – | 0 | – | 0 |
| Penn | | – | | 3 | – | 3 | – | 0 |
| Michigan | | – | | 1 | – | 1 | – | 0 |
| California | | – | | 0 | – | 1 | – | 0 |
| Princeton Theological | | – | | 0 | – | 1 | – | 0 |

The 1871–72 College of New Jersey Tigers men's soccer team represented Princeton University during the 1871–72 college soccer season. The team finished with a 1–0–0 record and was retroactively named the national soccer champion by the American Soccer History Archives and the Intercollegiate Football Record Association.

The Tigers played the nearby Princeton Theological Seminary in a match on October 21, 1871, where they won 6–4.

== Schedule ==
| Date Time, TV | Rank^{#} | Opponent^{#} | Result | Record | Site City, State |
Matches
| October 21, 1871* | | vs. Princeton Theological | W 6–4 | 1–0–0 | College Field; Princeton, NJ |
*Non-conference game. ^{#}Rankings from United Soccer Coaches. (#) Tournament seedings in parentheses.
