= 1934 Cornell Big Red men's soccer team =

American college soccer season

1934 Cornell Big Red men's soccer

ISFA National champions

MAISL champions
- Conference: Middle Atlantic Intercollegiate Soccer League
- Record: 5–0–2 (5–0–2 MAISL)
- Head coach: Schoellkopf Field (15th season)
- Assistant coach: Louis Bermejillo (4th season)
- Home stadium: Yale Field

1934 MAISL standings
	Conf.					Overall
Team	W		L		T	W		L		T
Cornell ‡	5	–	0	–	2	5	–	0	–	2
Penn	6	–	1	–	0	8	–	1	–	0
Haverford	3	–	1	–	3	3	–	2	–	3
Princeton	3	–	3	–	1	3	–	3	–	1
Navy	2	–	4	–	1	2	–	4	–	1
Lafayette	2	–	5	–	0	2	–	6	–	0
Swarthmore	1	–	4	–	2	2	–	4	–	2
Lehigh	0	–	7	–	0	0	–	10	–	0
‡ – MAISL champion

The 1934 Cornell Big Red men's soccer team represented Cornell University during the 1934 ISFA season. It was Cornell's 27th season fielding a varsity soccer team, and their 15th season with Nick Bawlf as the program's head coach. Cornell played in the Middle Atlantic Intercollegiate Soccer League.

To date, the 1934 season was the most successful season in Cornell men's soccer history, as the program won the ISFA national championship, going undefeated with a 5-0-2 record. It is the only season in Cornell men's soccer history where the program finished the campaign with an undefeated record.

Defender, Louis Bermejillo, was named an All-American at the conclusion of the season.

== Schedule ==
Date Time, TV	Rank^{#}	Opponent^{#}	Result	Record	Site City, State
Regular season
October 27		Penn	W 3–0		Schoellkopf Field; Ithaca, NY
November 3		Swarthmore	W 2–1		Schoellkopf Field; Ithaca, NY
November 15		Lehigh	W 2–1		Unknown; Unknown
November 22		Navy	W 1–0		Unknown; Unknown
November 29		at Haverford	T 1–1	5–0–2 (5–0–2)	Walton Field; Haverford, PA
