= Christian Ohiri =

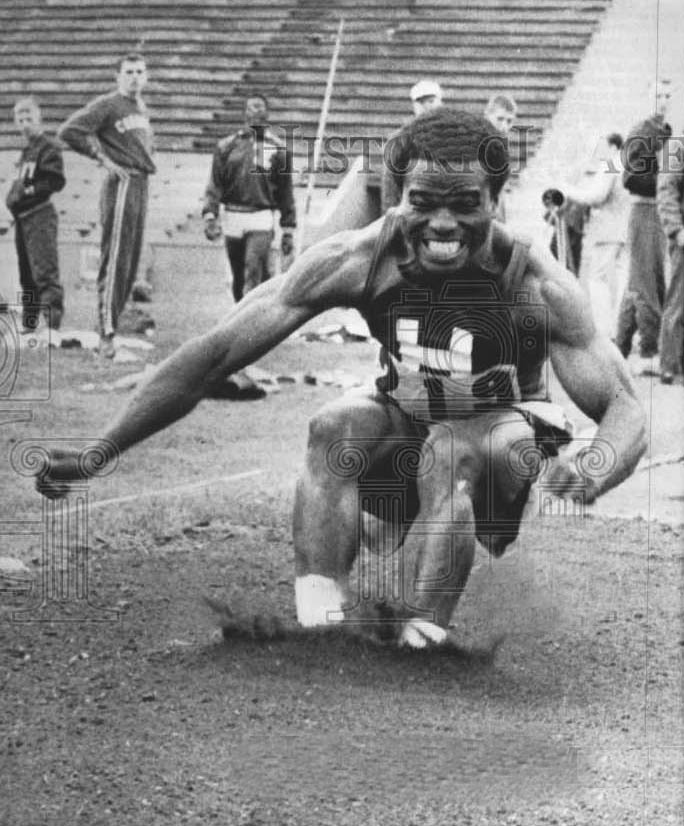
- Ohiri performing a triple jump at Harvard in May 1963

Personal information
- Nationality: Nigerian
- Born: 19 June 1938 Owerri, British Nigeria
- Died: 7 November 1966 (aged 28) Owerri, Nigeria
- Cause of death: Cancer (Note: The specific type of cancer is not clear, with some sources stating it was leukemia and others saying Ohiri died from lung cancer.)

Sport
- Sport: Athletics (triple jump); Association football
- NCAA DI track and field: 1964
- University team: Harvard soccer Harvard track and field
- Soccer tournament: Ivy League

Achievements and titles
- Regional finals: 1963, 1964 triple jump

Christian Ludger Ohiri (19 June 1938 – 7 November 1966) was a Nigerian athlete and association football player. He competed in the men's triple jump at the 1964 Summer Olympics.

Ohiri is regarded as one of Harvard's most talented athletes, having been inducted to the Harvard Athletics Hall of Fame in 1988. He is also considered among the greatest soccer players in Ivy League history.

== Biography ==
Born in Owerri, Nigeria, Ohiri attended school at Holy Ghost College in his native country, then attending Harvard University in the United States, where he arrived in 1959. He had been recruited following an initiative that sought out talented students from Africa after colonialism was in decline.

Before playing at Harvard, Ohiri had previously played for the Nigeria Olympic football team, scoring two goals in the African qualifiers for the 1960 Olympics held in Rome.

Ohiri played association football at Harvard soccer team, where he scored eight goals in his very first game. Ohiri set a record of 47 goals with Harvard, also winning three Ivy League titles.

Apart from football, Ohiri was a notable athlete, also competing for Harvard on triple jump. Ohiri won the triple jump at the IC4A Championships in both 1963 and 1964, and placed fifth in that event at the NCAA meet in 1964. At international level, he represented Nigeria in the 1964 Olympics.

After his magna cum laude graduation in 1964, he also attended Harvard Business School.

He died of cancer in 1966, soon after graduating from Harvard College. The first sign of the disease had appeared in Summer 1966, when Ohiri collapsed while playing tennis at the Harvard Business School.

== Legacy ==
Ohiri was inducted to the Harvard Hall of Fame in both sports, track and soccer, in 1988. Moreover, the Harvard soccer stadium was named "Ohiri Field" in 1983.

== Recognition ==
Harvard soccer coach (1948–73) Bruce Munro called him "the greatest soccer player ever at Harvard". while teammate John Thorndike stated that "he could've played on any team in the world."
