= The Green (Dartmouth College) =

Grass field at Dartmouth College

Coordinates: 43°42′12″N 72°17′19″W

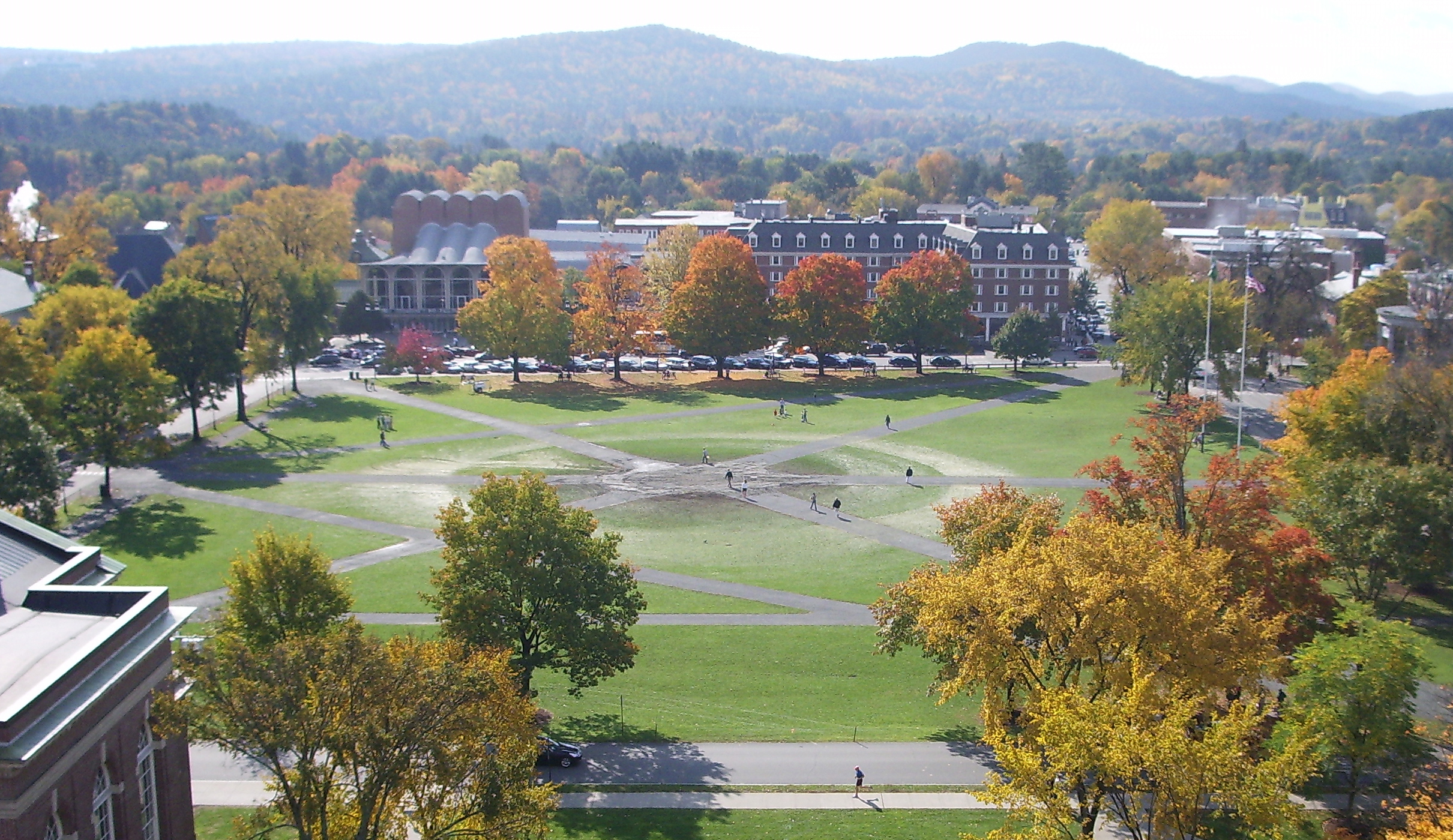
View of the Green looking south from the tower of Baker Memorial Library, shortly after the annual Homecoming bonfire. The Hopkins Center for the Arts (left) and the Hanover Inn (right) are visible on the opposite side.

The Green (formally the College Green) is a grass-covered field and common space at the center of Dartmouth College, an Ivy League university located in Hanover, New Hampshire, United States. It was among the first parcels of land obtained by the college upon its founding in 1769, and is the only creation of the 18th century remaining at the center of the campus. After being cleared of pine trees, it initially served as a pasture and later as an athletic field for College sporting events. Today, it is a central location for rallies, celebrations, and demonstrations, and serves as a general, all-purpose recreation area. The College describes the Green as "historic" and as the "emotional center" of the institution.

== Geography ==
A diagram of the Green

The Green is a five-acre (two-hectare) plot located in the center of downtown Hanover, New Hampshire and on traditional land of the Abenaki indigenous group. It is crossed by seven gravel walking paths, the locations of which varied until about 1931, when the configuration was last altered. Three of them bisect the Green, running southwest to northeast, northwest to southeast, and east to west. The northernmost of its two east-west paths was added after Massachusetts Hall was constructed in 1907, and links the central entrance to that dormitory west of the Green to the northern entrance to Dartmouth Hall, east of it. Two paths run from the northwest and southwest corners respectively to the middle of the Green's eastern edge. A final path runs north-south along the eastern side. The Green also has paved sidewalks along its southern and western edges.

The Green is not perfectly rectangular. Its southern border along Wheelock Street runs slightly to the northeast rather than due east-west. This irregularity is due to the Town of Hanover's 1873 seizure of part of the southeast corner of the Green, which it used to straighten Wheelock Street. The Green had previously extended 30 feet (nine meters) farther south on that corner.

Benches and trees border the outside edges of the Green; two flagpoles stand at the center of the western side. The plot is bounded by four streets: Wheelock Street to the south, College Street to the east, Wentworth Street to the north, and Main Street to the west. All but Wheelock Street are one-way roads, with traffic circulating counter-clockwise around the Green.

Many of Dartmouth's important campus buildings are located around the Green. To the north lies Baker Memorial Library, Dartmouth's principal library, Webster Hall, containing Rauner Special Collections Library, and Sanborn Hall, home to the English department. On the west side sits the administration building, Parkhurst Hall, the admissions building, McNutt Hall, and two student buildings, Robinson Hall and the Collis Center. To the south sits the Hanover Inn, a College-owned hotel, and the Hopkins Center for the Arts. To the east lies the historic Dartmouth Row buildings, composed Wentworth Hall, Dartmouth Hall, Thornton Hall, and Reed Hall, as well as Rollins Chapel.

== History ==
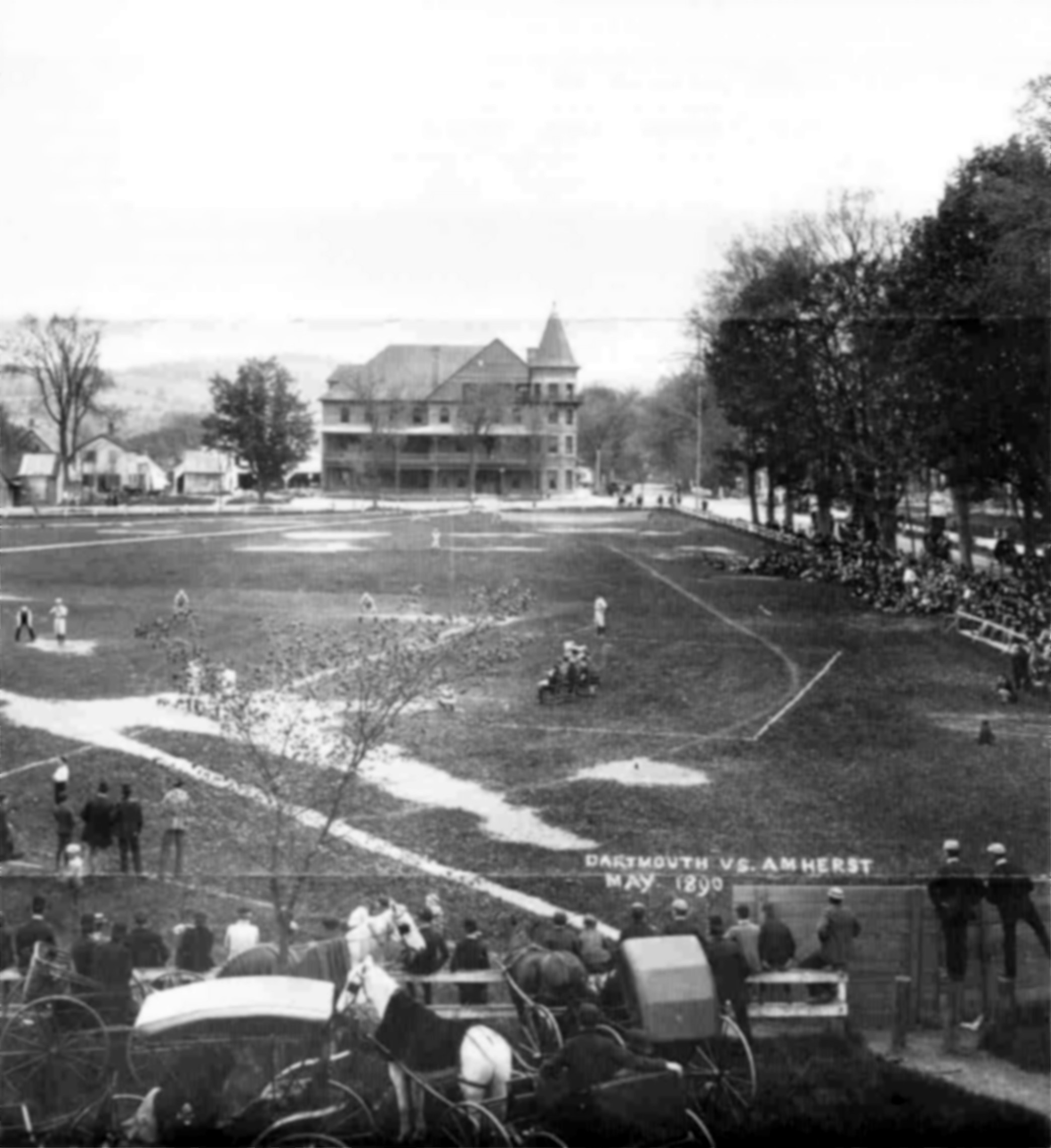
An 1890 baseball game being played against Amherst College on the Green.

The land on which the Green sits was originally a pine forest, with some trees reaching the height of 270 feet (82 m), high enough to block out the sun. The process of clearing the pines was begun in 1770 by the newly founded Dartmouth College. The village plan of Hanover was laid out the following year. It included as its central feature an open square of 7.5 acres (3 ha) (three hectares). Even though the land had been cleared, many tree stumps remained until 1831; for a long period, it was a Dartmouth tradition for the graduating class to remove one stump.

The Green was not maintained at first; after being cleared, it was unkempt and ragged, sloping sharply towards a swamp in the southwest corner. As early as 1807, the college was debating the future of the plot, considering using it for a variety of purposes. In 1828, the Board of Trustees finally voted to plow, seed, level, and fence the area. Lack of funding would delay this plan from being carried out immediately; the Green was leveled in 1831 and finally fenced in 1836. The main road from Hanover to the northward Lyme, New Hampshire, had previously led diagonally across the Green, and due to the new fences, had to be diverted around it.

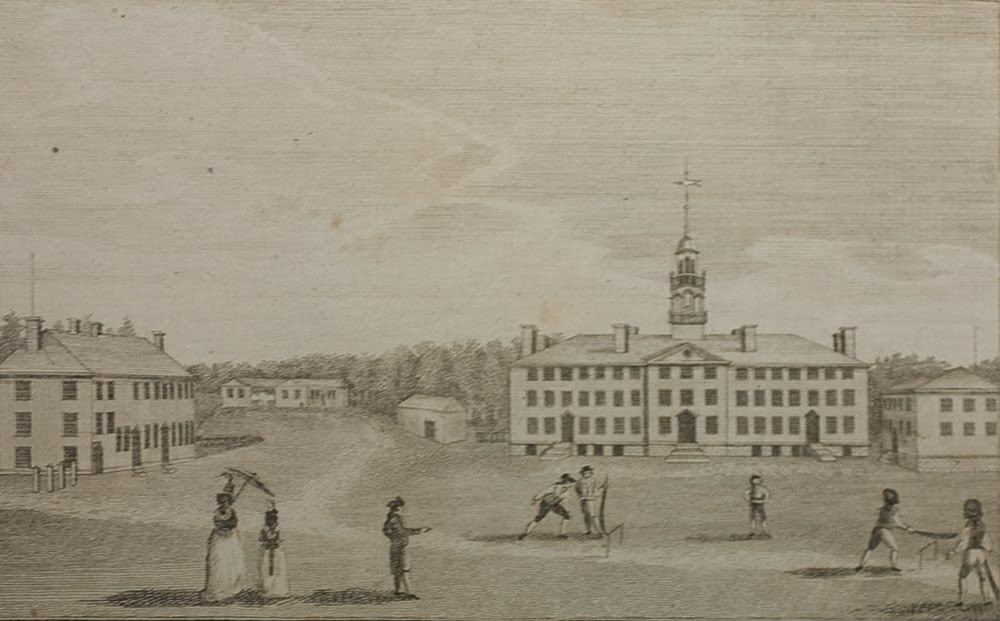
The Green is prominently featured in the earliest known image of Dartmouth (circa 1793). The engraving may also be the first visual proof of cricket being played in the United States.

One of the Green's earliest uses was as a pasture for cattle belonging to the town's residents. Dartmouth students resented this use and, in the early 19th century, herded all the cattle into the basement of Dartmouth Hall as a protest. The fence constructed during the 1836 renovations was in part a response to this action and was meant to keep animals out.

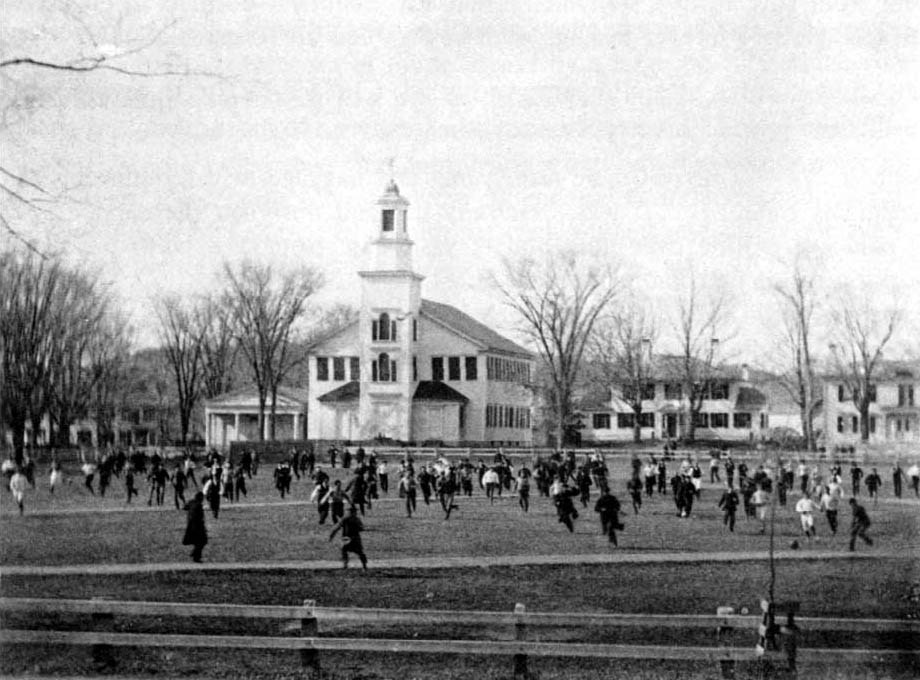
Students playing old division football on the Green, 1874.

In 1824, a Hanover ordinance permitted "the playing at ball or any game in which ball is used on the public common in front of Dartmouth College," confirming the Green's ongoing use as an athletic field. Cricket was among the games regularly played on the Green in the 18th century, and old division football was played by the 1820s. Dartmouth's first intercollegiate matches in baseball (1866), track and field (1875), football (1881), and tennis (1884) took place there. The college built its first gymnasium (Bissell Gymnasium) on the southeast corner of the Green in 1866-67.

In April 1873, the Town of Hanover seized part of the southeast corner of the green to align East and West Wheelock Streets; the town moved the fence thirty feet to the north of its original position. Dartmouth students protested by tearing down and burning the rebuilt fence; the town threatened to reopen Main Street on its previous route from the Green's southwest corner across to the northeast. To quickly replace the fence and prevent the road from reopening, College President Asa Dodge Smith convinced students to pay for the new fence. In 1893, when the fence's original purpose of keeping out livestock was no longer needed, the college decided to tear it down, to much student and alumni outcry. The class of 1893 restored and sponsored part of the fence as a "senior fence," and today, the Senior Fence runs along the parts of the southern and western borders closest to the southwest corner. Only senior students were allowed to sit on it, and first-year students in violation of this policy were soaked in a nearby watering trough.

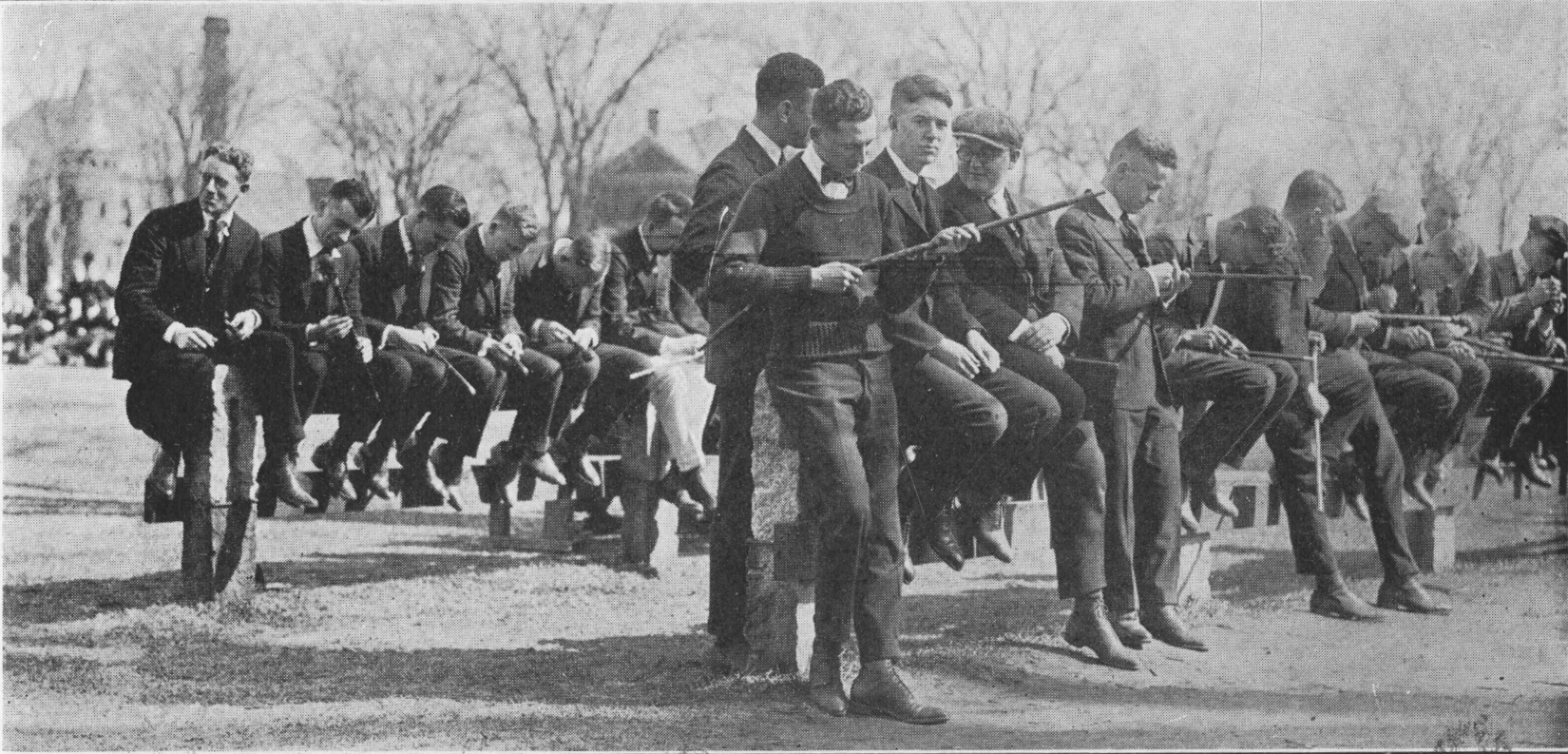
Men carving canes while sitting on the Senior Fence.

In 1906, the board of trustees voted to officially name the space "the College Green", although at the time the space also went by names such as "the College Square", "the Common", and "the Campus". Aside from minor changes in furnishing, vegetation, and crosspaths, the Green has remained largely unchanged since being cleared.

== Uses ==
The 2007–2008 edition of Dartmouth's Student Handbook states that the Green is reserved "for informal use, including rallies and other assemblies, by students, faculty, staff, and guests of the College... and for a limited number of traditional events". Since other facilities have superseded its use as such, the Green is no longer used for official athletic competitions. Nevertheless, informal sports and games frequently occur on the Green. Like all of the Dartmouth campus, the entirety of the Green is Wi-Fi-enabled.

=== Rallies and protests ===
Given the Green's role as "the physical and emotional center of campus life," it is often the setting for protests, rallies, and demonstrations. Dartmo, an online directory of Dartmouth College's buildings, describes the Green as being "used any time when collective joy or frustration is to be expressed". Dartmouth's Student Handbook explicitly permits the Green to be used for demonstrations and rallies.

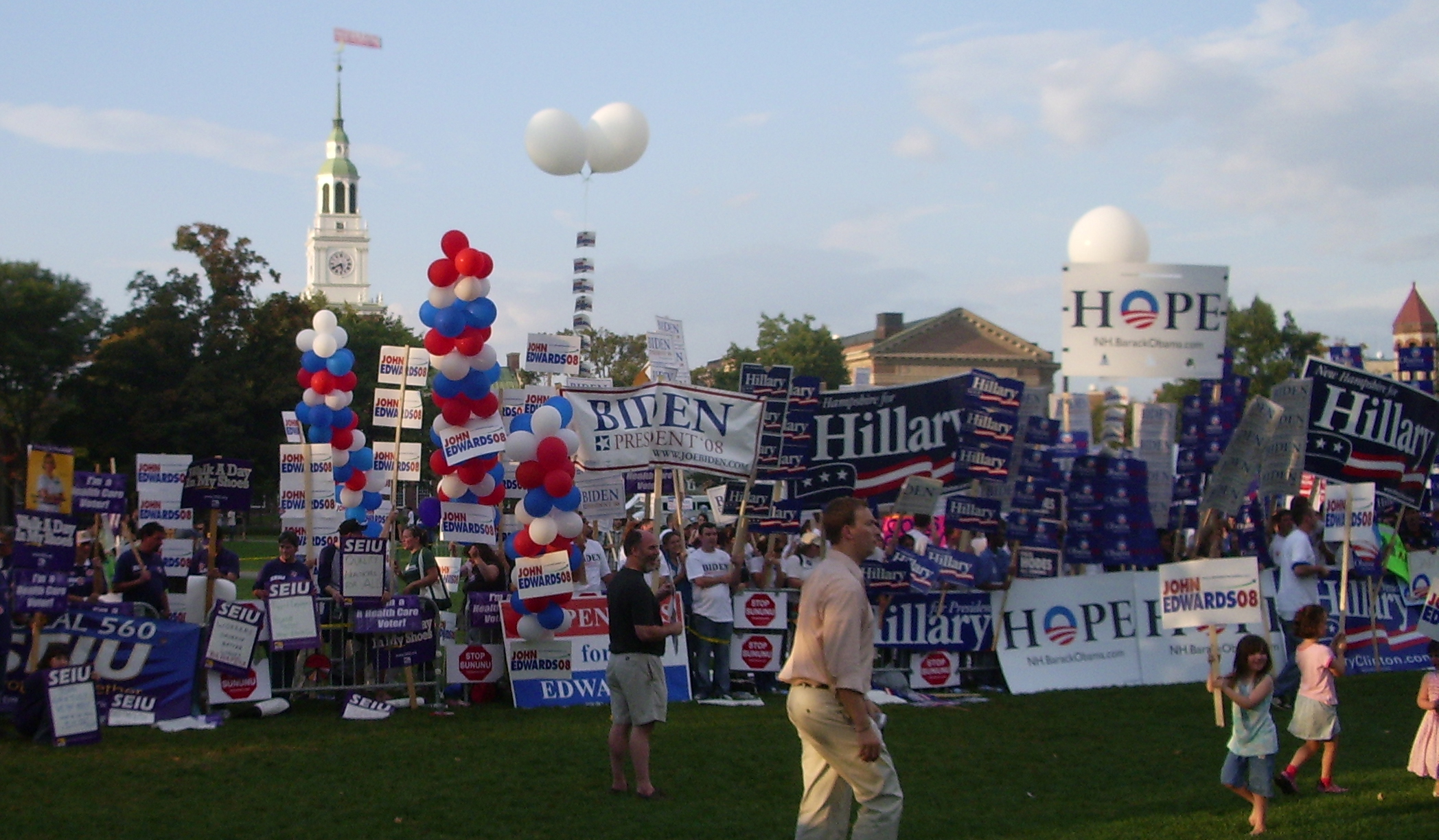
Students and community members rally on the Green for Democratic candidates in the 2008 Presidential election.

One of the earliest student demonstrations took place in 1814, when students gathered on the Green to celebrate Napoleon's defeat in Europe. At the height of the Vietnam War in the late 1960s, the Green regularly saw antiwar demonstrations, some attracting up to a thousand protesters. A 1969 protest over the presence of the campus Reserve Officer Training Corps (ROTC) program culminated in the occupation of Parkhurst Hall, the College's administration building. In 1986, students constructed shanties on the Green to encourage the College to divest from South African companies supporting Apartheid; staffers of the conservative newspaper The Dartmouth Review took sledgehammers to the structures. More recently, the Green was the location of a controversial 2006 May Day rally in favor of immigrant rights.

On September 26, 2007, Dartmouth hosted a Democratic Presidential Candidates Debate. The Green was the site of student rallies in favor of various candidates, and also saw the live broadcast of Hardball with Chris Matthews. On April 30, 2016, Divest Dartmouth—a student group trying to divest from a list of 200 fossil fuel companies—led a climate change rally on the Green, the largest in New Hampshire's history organizers claimed.

=== Traditions and celebrations ===
Dartmouth is well known for its variety of long-standing student traditions, many of which are centered on the Green. At Homecoming each fall, a bonfire is constructed on the Green by the first-year class; students and community members gather to watch the first-year students run around it as it burns. The wintertime celebration of Winter Carnival sees the construction of a snow sculpture on the Green. In the springtime, Green Key Weekend is marked by concerts and performances on the Green, which until 1984 was also the site of fiercely competitive Green Key chariot races.

Other traditions involving the Green include the placement of a Christmas tree and Hanukkah candle each December, the annual celebration of Diwali, and an annual Native American Pow-Wow. Students gather on the Green on the night of the winter's first snowfall for a school-wide snowball fight. The College's commencement ceremonies are traditionally held on the Green, regardless of weather conditions.

== See also ==
- Quadrangle (architecture)
