= Ohiri Field =

Soccer stadium in Boston, USA

- Interactive map of Ohiri Field
- Address: Boston; United States
- Coordinates: 42.365387°N 71.125585°W
- Owner: Harvard University
- Operator: Harvard University Athletics
- Capacity: 1,500
- Surface: Grass
- Field size: 120 × 75 yards

Construction
- Opened: 1983; 43 years ago

Tenants
- Harvard Crimson (NCAA) teams: men's and women's soccer

Website
- gocrimson.com/ohiri-field

Ohiri Field is a soccer-specific stadium located on the campus of Harvard University in the Allston neighborhood of Boston. Although the core of the Harvard campus is in Cambridge, the athletic complex lies within Boston. From its opening in 1983

== Overview ==
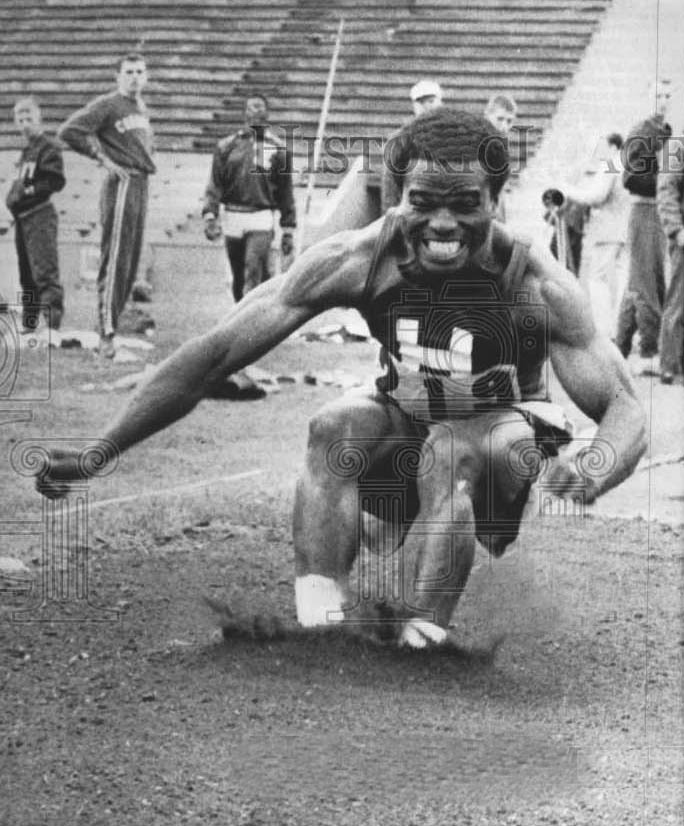
The stadium was named after athlete Christian Ohiri (photo)

Until 2010, it was home to the Harvard Crimson men's and women's soccer teams; with the opening of a new stadium now known as Jordan Field, in September 2010, it has become the secondary home to both teams.

The stadium seats 1,500 people and has held as much as 5,200 people for NCAA tournament games. It opened in 1983 and is named after Christian Ohiri, who was a prominent soccer player and triple jump athlete for Harvard in the 1960s. Ohiri is regarded as one of Harvard's most talented athletes. Ohiri set a record of 47 goals with Harvard, also winning three Ivy League titles.

Ohiri Field is notable for being the site of the first-ever napalm test on July 4, 1942.
