= Old division football =

Mob football game from New Hampshire, US

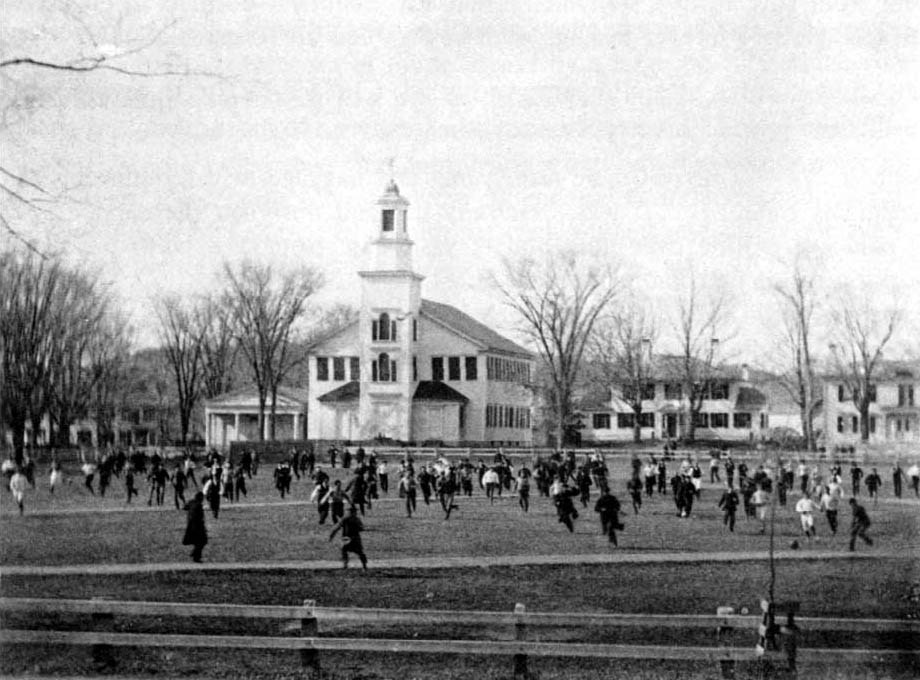
- Old division game played on the Green at Dartmouth College in 1874
- First played: 1820s

Characteristics
- Contact: Yes
- Team members: Dartmouth College
- Type: Medieval football
- Equipment: Football ball
- Venue: The Green (Dartmouth)

Presence
- Country or region: United States
- Olympic: No
- World Championships: No
- Paralympic: No

Old division football was a mob football game played from the 1820s to around 1890 by students at Dartmouth College in Hanover, New Hampshire, U.S.

The game was first played before the rules for association football and rugby football were standardized in England, and it continued to rely on its own local rules for some time after students learned of the newer imports. Dartmouth students published the rules of what is now called old division football in 1871.

The game involved unlimited sides made up variously of the members of the two literary societies on campus: the United Fraternity versus the Social Friends ("Fraters v. Socials"); the even-numbered class years versus the odd-numbered years ("Old Division" or "Whole Division") and sometimes "New Hampshire v. the World". Every year, a special match, sometimes called the Usual Game of Foot Ball, occurred early in the fall in which the sophomores took on the freshmen. The game was more about bragging rights, and by the late nineteenth century involved little more than a mob fight over possession of the round ball. The event became known as the 'Usual Football Rush' and then simply the 'Football Rush', lasting until 1948.

== Rules (1871) ==
1. Five umpires, one from each class in the Academical, and one from the Scientific Department, shall be elected annually by the college. The senior umpire present shall settle all disputes which arise concerning the game.
2. The ball shall be warned from the second base of the college grounds and towards the buildings. No warn shall be valid until both parties are ready.
3. Until the ball is kicked the warning party shall stand behind the ball and their opponents in front; the latter at a distance of at least two rods. These positions, and the warn as well, shall be changed each game.
4. No player shall kick, trip, strike, or hold another for any cause during the game.
5. It shall be considered foul when the ball is caught on the bound, or fly, or picked from the ground; when it passes the fence at the north or south end of the common, or at either corner, or when knocked past the east or west fence.
6. In case of a foul the ball shall be tossed up by the umpire at the place where the foul occurs, unless it be within two rods of either fence, in which case the ball shall be brought directly in a distance of two rods before umpiring.
7. The game shall be won when the ball is kicked past the east or west fence.

== Sources ==
- Football Rules, "Editorial Department", The Dartmouth 5, No. 9 (October 1871), 364-365.
- Football Rules, "Editorial Department", The Dartmouth 8, No. 7 (September 1874), 264, reprinted in Aegis 1926 (1926), 486.)
- "Old Division Football, the Indigenous Mob Soccer of Dartmouth College"
- "Good Morning Class, and Welcome to Football History 101..." from NCAA FB FANS blog
- History of Football by HistoryofSports.net
