= Alex Harris (American soccer) =

American soccer player (born 2005)

Personal information
- Full name: Alexander Dean Harris
- Date of birth: February 16, 2005 (age 21)
- Place of birth: Vancouver, Washington, U.S.
- Height: 5 ft 11 in (1.80 m)
- Position: Striker

Team information
- Current team: Colorado Rapids
- Number: 16

Youth career
- 2019–2023: Washington Timbers

College career
Years	Team	Apps	(Gls)
2023–2024	Cornell Big Red	34	(31)

Senior career*
Years	Team	Apps	(Gls)
2024	United PDX	3	(2)
2025–	Colorado Rapids	7	(0)
2025–	→ Colorado Rapids 2 (loan)	16	(8)
- * Club domestic league appearances and goals as of November 5, 2025

Alexander Dean Harris (born February 16, 2005) is an American professional soccer player who plays as a forward for Major League Soccer club Colorado Rapids. On December 18, 2024, Harris was announced as a 2025 MLS Generation Adidas athlete and was then selected with the No. 4 overall pick in the 2025 MLS SuperDraft held on December 20, 2024.

== Early life ==
Growing up, Harris played for a club team, the Washington Timbers, and his high school, Columbia River High School.

== College career ==
=== Cornell University ===
In December 2022, Harris was officially accepted into Cornell University's College of Engineering and committed to play for Cornell Big Red. Harris made his collegiate debut as a freshman starter in the season opener on September 1, 2023 against the Vermont Catamounts (2024 NCAA National Champions). Harris scored his first and second collegiate goals (brace) on September 9, 2023 against the Canisius Golden Griffins. Harris then scored his second collegiate brace in the fifth match on September 19, 2023 helping Cornell Big Red earn its first victory of all-time against a defending (2022) NCAA National Champion, Syracuse Orange, with a 2-1 final score.

Harris concluded his 2023 freshman campaign with 15 appearances (14 starts) registering 28 points on 12 goals and four assists in his first run on East Hill. Harris led the team in goals, assists, points, shots on goal (29) and game winning goals (4). Not only did Harris score the most points and goals of any first-year Cornellian in the history of the program (dating back to 1908), the 12-goal season was the highest for all freshmen across the country. This earned the first-year forward Harris a unanimous Ivy League selection for Rookie of The Year along with First Team All-Ivy honors. Harris was also named ECAC Rookie of The Year and received the prestigious TopDrawerSoccer National Freshman of The Year award, marking the first Ivy League player to ever win the award.

Harris concluded his 2024 sophomore campaign with 19 appearances (all starts) registering 43 points on 19 goals and five assists leading Cornell Big Red to a 4-2 first round NCAA DI Men's Soccer Tournament win over Fordham Rams, in which Harris scored a brace. This advanced Cornell Big Red to the second round of the NCAA DI Men's Soccer Tournament where they played the Pittsburgh Panthers to a 0-1 loss. The Pittsburgh Panthers advanced to the NCAA DI Men's Soccer Tournament quarterfinals where they lost to the Vermont Catamounts, the eventual 2024 NCAA National Champions.

At the conclusion of the 2024 NCAA DI Men's Soccer Tournament/Season Harris held the No. 2 position in the country for Total Points (43), Points Per Game (2.26), Total Goals (19), Goals Per Game (1.00), Shots Per Game (4.53), and Shots On Goal Per Game (2.53). This earned the second-year forward Harris an Ivy League selection for Offensive Player of the Year (becoming the first Cornellian to receive this honor) along with consecutive season First Team All-Ivy honors (unanimous selection).

Harris was also named as a semifinalist for the MAC Hermann Trophy (one of only two sophomores selected) while again being named ECAC Offensive Player of The Year. On December 25, 2024, TopDrawerSoccer released their NCAA DI Men's Soccer postseason player rankings where Harris was named as the fifth best player in the country ("Harris would have locked down the top spot if not for a second-round exit").

On December 10, 2024 Harris was announced as an invitee to attend the four-day 2024 Adidas MLS College Showcase held in San Diego, California. Upon the conclusion of the College Showcase (December 14, 2024), the sophomore Harris was offered a Generation Adidas contract by MLS. On December 17, 2024 Harris signed his Generation Adidas contract officially declaring himself as a professional which also signified he would not be returning to Cornell Big Red for a third season. Harris concluded his Cornell career with 71 points on 31 goals and nine assists in 34 appearances. In only two seasons (34 appearances) Harris finished fourth all-time in career goals (31), third all-time in career points (71), third all-time in career game-winning goals (8), and first in penalty-kicks made (8). Harris also earned multiple all-time single season records finishing second in goals (19), second in points (43), second in shots (86), first in games played and started (19), and first in penalty-kicks made (4).

== Club career ==
=== Colorado Rapids ===
Harris was selected with the No. 4 overall selection by the Colorado Rapids in the 2025 MLS SuperDraft.

Harris made his MLS debut for the Rapids in a 2–0 win over Charlotte FC.

Harris made his first MLS start for the Rapids against Portland Timbers on February 28, 2026, recording 57 minutes before being taken off for a second half sub.
