= Jim Barlow =

American soccer coach

Jim Barlow is a soccer coach who has been the head coach of the Princeton Tigers men's soccer team since 1996. At Princeton, Barlow is the winningest men's soccer coach in school history and has led the team to five Ivy League titles and five NCAA Division I Men's Soccer Tournament berths.

Raised in Hightstown, New Jersey, Barlow was a soccer star at Hightstown High School, where he was named as Player of the Year by the New Jersey Soccer Coaches Association in 1986 and chosen as part of the Parade All-America soccer team in 1987. He played soccer at Princeton, graduating in 1991 with a degree in history. At Princeton, he was named as Ivy League Player of the Year in 1990, the first Tigers athlete to win the Ivy League's top soccer honor.

Barlow was chosen as the head coach of the Princeton men's soccer team in 1996, at the age of 26, to succeed Bob Bradley, who left to join the coaching staff of D.C. United. As head coach, Barlow has a cumulative record of 188-161-63 through the 2020 season, the most of any men's soccer coach in Princeton history. His teams have won the Ivy League title in 1999, 2001, 2010, 2014 and 2018. He has led his squad to the NCAA Division I Soccer Tournament in 1999, 2001, 2009, 2010 and 2018, losing in the first round in each of those five years. Barlow was named by the Ivy League as its Coach of the Year in 2018 and again in 2021. Barlow's staff were named the Ivy League Coaching Staff of the Year in 2025.
