= Will Kohler =

American soccer player

Personal information
- Full name: William A. Kohler
- Date of birth: March 13, 1975 (age 51)
- Place of birth: Bala Cynwyd, Pennsylvania, U.S.
- Height: 5 ft 8 in (1.73 m)
- Position: Midfielder

Youth career
- 1990–1995: FC DELCO
- 1993–1996: Harvard Crimson

Senior career*
Years	Team	Apps	(Gls)
1999–2000	Boston Bulldogs	31	(1)

International career
1991	United States U17		
- * Club domestic league appearances and goals

Will Kohler is an American retired soccer midfielder who was a member of the United States U-17 men's national soccer team at the 1991 FIFA U-17 World Championship. He won the 1991 USYSA U-16 championship with F.C. Delco.

Nowadays, Will works in Venture capital and is a partner with Lightspeed Ventures Partners.

== Soccer ==
Kohler graduated from Lower Merion High School in Ardmore, Pennsylvania, where he was a three time All State soccer player. He was a 1991 and 1992 High School All-American. He is a member of the Lower Merion Soccer Hall of Fame. During high school, he also played for F.C. Delco from 1990 to 1995. In 1995, Delco went to the 1991 U-16 USYSA National Youth Championship game where Kohler scored in Delco's 2–0 victory over Countryside F.C. Kohler attended Harvard University, where he played on the men's soccer team from 1993 to 1996. He graduated in 1997 with a bachelor's degree in economics. In February 1997, the MetroStars selected Kohler in the second round (fifteenth overall) of the 1997 MLS College Draft. They released him during the pre-season.

== Venture capital ==
Kohler helped found Pointe Communications. He then began a career in venture capital beginning with Prospect Street Ventures. He was a principal at Prism VentureWorks. In February 2010, Kohler became a general partner with Summerhill Venture Partners. Since 2014, Kohler has been a partner at Lightspeed Venture Partners.
