= Charles F. Berman Field =

Multi-use stadium in Ithaca, New York

Coordinates: 42.446456°N 76.473676°W

Berman Field
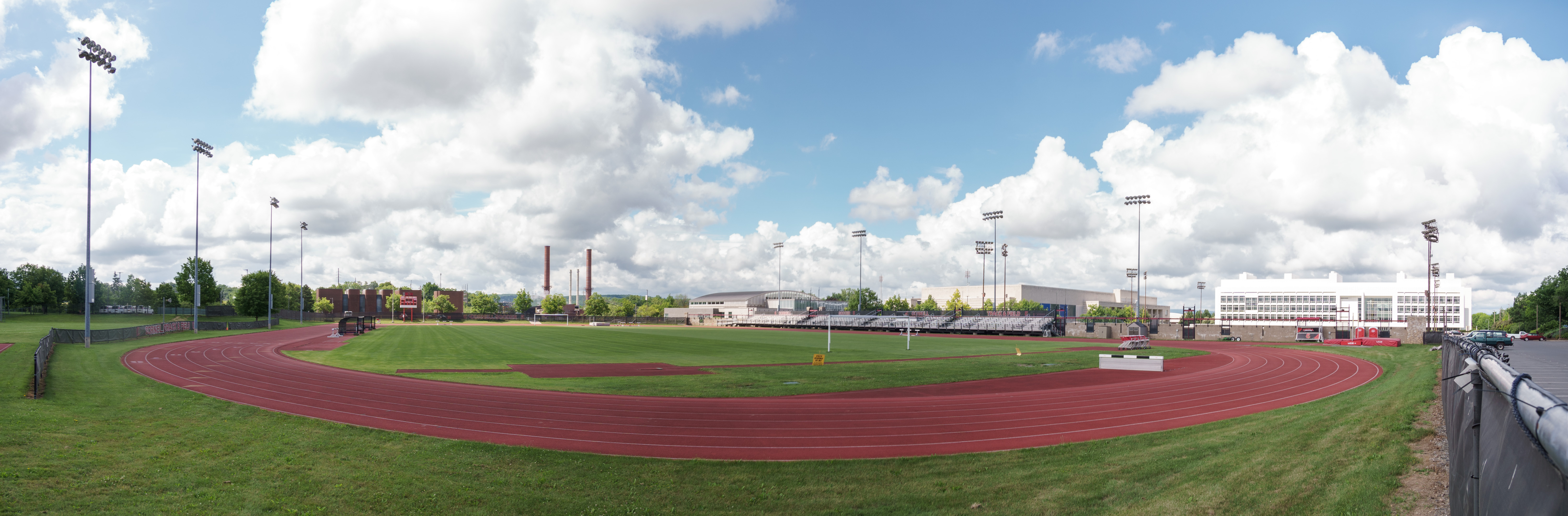
- View of the field in 2023
- Interactive map of Berman Field
- Full name: Charles F. Berman Field
- Address: Ithaca, NY; United States
- Owner: Cornell University
- Operator: Cornell Athletics
- Capacity: 1,000
- Type: Stadium
- Field size: 108 x 68 m
- Current use: Soccer

Construction
- Opened: 2000; 26 years ago

Tenants
- Cornell Big Red (NCAA) teams: men's and women's soccer

Website
- cornellbigred.com/berman-field

Charles F. Berman Field is a soccer-specific stadium located on the campus of Cornell University in Ithaca, New York. The stadium serves as home venue to the Cornell Big Red men's and women's soccer teams.

== Description ==
Charles F. Berman Field is located along Tower Road across from Rice Hall. Measuring 118 yards by 74 yards, it is situated inside the William E. Simon running track. The grass playing surface is a mix of 30 percent rye and 70 percent Kentucky bluegrass, which was chosen for its "adaptability to close mowing."

Constructed in 2000, the 1,000 seat stadium is named in honor of former Cornell soccer player Charles F. Berman who was captain of the 1948 Cornell soccer team and a member of the Quill and Dagger society. Berman perished in an airplane crash in Jamaica en route to Colombia on January 21, 1960.

== Robert J. Kane Sports Complex ==
Berman Field, along with the Kroch Throwing Fields and Simon Track, together comprise the "Robert J. Kane Sports Complex".
