= Harvard Crimson men's soccer =

Men's soccer team of Harvard University

- Founded: 1905; 121 years ago
- University: Harvard University
- Location: Boston, Massachusetts, US
- Stadium: Jordan Field (capacity: 4,100)
- Nickname: Crimson
- Colors: Crimson, white, and black
Home	Away

Pre-tournament ISFA/ISFL championships
- 1913, 1914, 1926, 1930

NCAA tournament College Cup
- 1969, 1971, 1986, 1987

NCAA tournament Quarterfinals
- 1969, 1970, 1971, 1972, 1984, 1986, 1987

NCAA tournament Round of 16
- 1969, 1970, 1971, 1972, 1984, 1986, 1987, 2009

NCAA tournament appearances
- 1968, 1969, 1970, 1971, 1972, 1974, 1984, 1986, 1987, 1994, 1996, 2001, 2006, 2007, 2008, 2009

Conference regular season championships
- 1955, 1958, 1959, 1961, 1962, 1963, 1969, 1970, 1987, 1994, 1996, 2006, 2009

The Harvard Crimson men's soccer team is an intercollegiate varsity sports team of Harvard University. The team is a member of the Ivy League of the National Collegiate Athletic Association.

Harvard is one of the most successful teams of the Ivy League, having won 13 championships. In the pre-NCAA era, Harvard also won 4 Intercollegiate Soccer Football Association (ISFA) championship titles.

== History ==
The Crimson fielded their first varsity soccer team in 1905, making the team one of the oldest college soccer programs in the United States, and one of the oldest continuously operating soccer programs in the United States. Most of the Crimson's success came in the mid-1910s, where they won two ISFL (the college soccer predecessor to the NCAA) championships, and again in the late 1920s to the early 1930s.

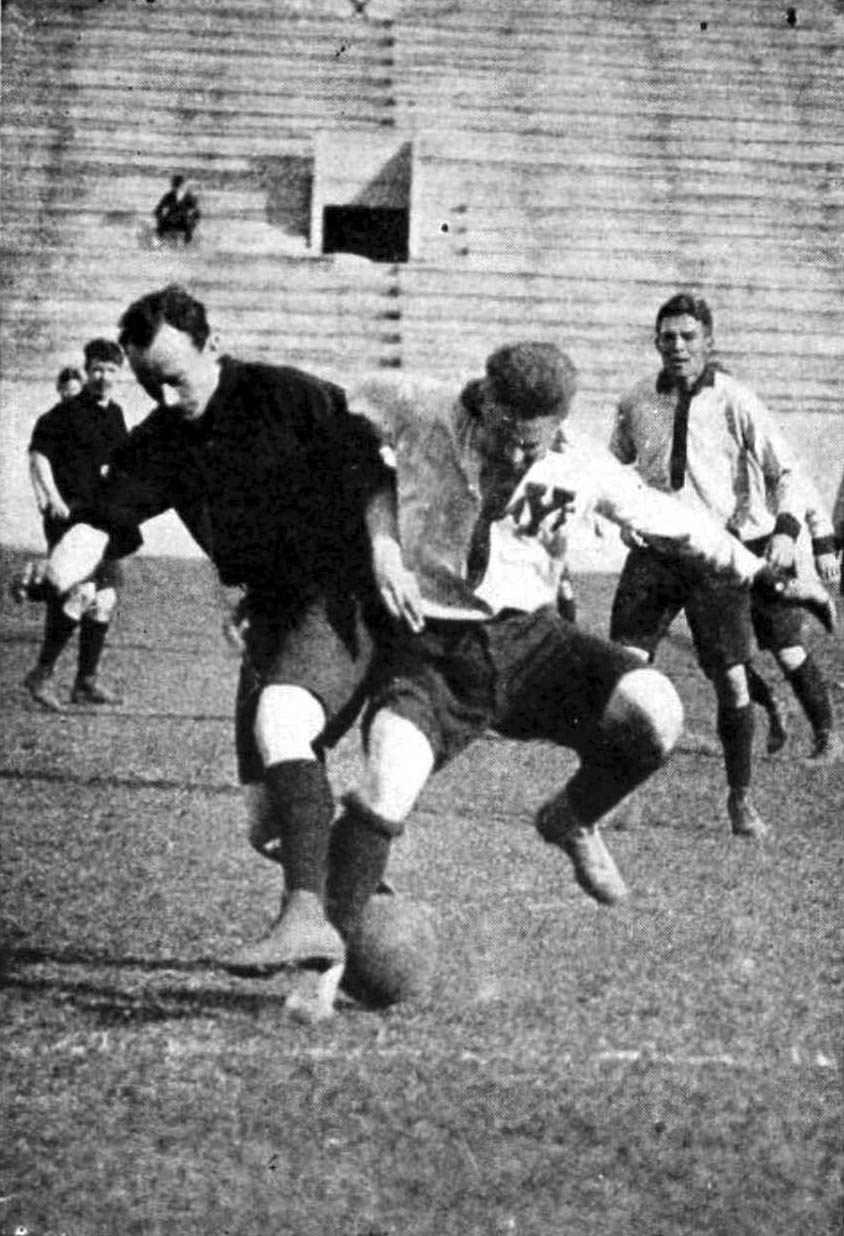
A Harvard (dark shirt) v Yale game in 1922

Since their 1930 ISFL title, the Crimson have failed to win a national title, although in the late 1960s and early 1970s the Crimson reached the College Cup twice. Also, in both 1986 and 1987 the Crimson reached the NCAA Division I Final Four. Their most recent appearance in the NCAA Division I Men's Soccer Championship came in 2009, when the Crimson reached the round of 16.

From 2013 through 2019, the Crimson were coached by Pieter Lehrer, a former assistant coach for the California Golden Bears men's soccer program. In 2014, Ross Friedman attained two all-time Harvard records with 12 season assists and 17 career assists, also ranking 6th in the NCAA in assists and 5th in assists per game.

In November 2016, the team were suspended by the university after the student newspaper The Harvard Crimson published an article which indicated that team members had shared a yearly document in which they ranked new members of Harvard Crimson women's soccer team by their sex appeal and described them using sexually explicit terms. The suspension meant that they could no longer participate in any further games in the 2016 Ivy League men's soccer season (which they had been leading at the time of the suspension) or the National Collegiate Athletic Association.

Several professional soccer players, including Shep Messing, Ross Friedman, Andre Akpan, Michael Fucito and John Catliff played for the Crimson, as well as several notable professionals outside of the soccer world. This includes Theodore Roosevelt III, Daniel Needham and John Johansen.

== Team image ==
Historically, the Harvard soccer teams have worn white kits as their primary colors, while alternate kits have been crimson or black.

== Stadiums ==
Harvard has used different venues through its history, with the current location being the Jordan Field, formerly called "Soldiers Field Soccer Stadium") located on the Harvard's Allston campus.

The stadium was opened in 2010, serving as home venue not only for the men's and women's soccer, but the men's and women's lacrosse teams.

Ohiri Field was Harvard's home from 1983 until 2009. The stadium still operated as second home to soccer teams. The stadium was named after Christian Ohiri, a prominent soccer player and triple jump athlete for Harvard in the 1960s, and regarded as one of Harvard's most talented athletes. Ohiri set a record of 47 goals with Harvard, also winning three Ivy League titles.

Harvard Stadium was the first stadium for the soccer team, from 1905 to 1982. Although it serves primarily for football games, Harvard Stadium has hosted several sporting events such as ice hockey (during World War I), track and field, and lacrosse, hosting professional team Boston Cannons' games since 2007.

== Players ==
=== Current roster ===
As of 1 Nov 2026

Note: Flags indicate national team as defined under FIFA eligibility rules; some limited exceptions apply. Players may hold more than one non-FIFA nationality.

No.	Pos.	Nation	Player
00	GK	USA	Jason Broome
0	GK	USA	Nicholas Willen
1	GK	USA	Jan Hejna
2	DF	USA	Mikey Cortellessa
3	DF	USA	Juan Pablo Fregosoa
4	DF	USA	Alexander Castel
5	DF	USA	Maxwell Mobray
6	DF	USA	Nayan Das
7	FW	USA	Dylan Tellado
8	MF	USA	Phoenix Wooten
9	FW	JPN	Yuta Hata
10	MF	USA	Ben Kelly
11	FW	CYP	Andreas Savva
12	FW	USA	Andreas Engle
13	DF	GER	Tim Langenbahn

No.	Pos.	Nation	Player
14	FW	USA	Xavier Tanyi
15	MF	BRA	Lucas Benuce
16	MF	USA	Drew Lobley
17	MF	UKR	Adam Poliakov
18	MF	SVK	Tobias Barnas
19	FW	USA	Christo Velikin
20	MF	USA	Shane Lonergan
24	FW	USA	Gil de Souza
25	MF	USA	Kiko Elliott
26	MF	USA	Arnav Maskey
27	DF	USA	Alejandro Palacio
28	FW	USA	Sophian Lovato
29	DF	NZL	Ryan Shen
77	GK	USA	Will Sherwood
99	GK	USA	Jason Broome

=== Notable alumni ===
- (Canada) John Catliff (1983–86)
- (United States) Shep Messing (1970–71)
- (United States) Ross Friedman (2010–13)

=== First Team All-Americans ===
Harvard has fielded 38 first-team All-Americans. Several players including Andre Akpan, John Catliff and Will Kohler had professional careers following college. Other notable All-Americans include John Johansen, who was part of the Harvard Five and Daniel Needham, who was a future politician and commanding general for the 26th Infantry Division.

Player	Pos.	Year
Lester Cushing	DF	1909
Frank Leland	FW	1909
Elwyn Barron	DF	1910, 1912
Harry Byng	FW	1911, 1912
Brayton Nichols	GK	1912
Eugene McCall	MF	1912
Daniel Needham	GK	1912
Henry Francke	MF	1913
Francis Grant	MF	1913
Walter Weld	FW	1913, 1914, 1915
J. Coleman Jennings	FW	1914
Richard Cooke	FW	1916
John Sullivan	DF	1922
Randolph Heizer	FW	1922

Player	Pos.	Year
Walter Pattison	DF	1924
Joseph MacKinnon	MF	1925
Laurence Driggs	FW	1925
Richard Thomas	GK	1926
John Faude	GK	1930
John Bland	MF	1930
Harvard Broadbent	FW	1932
Theodore Robie	DF	1935
John Dorman	MF	1935
James Wood	FW	1935
Bernard Jacobsen	MF	1939
John Johansen	FW	1939

Player	Pos.	Year
Richard Gifford	MF	1942
Charley Ufford	DF	1952
Langley Keyes	FW	1959
Marsh McCall	MF	1959
Tom Bagnoli	GK	1962
Christian Ohiri	FW	1963
Solomon Gomez	FW	1969, 1970
Chris Wilmot	DF	1969, 1970
Chris Papagianis	FW	1972
John Catliff	FW	1986
Will Kohler	FW	1996
Andre Akpan	FW	2008, 2009

=== Second Team All-Americans ===
Harvard has fielded 16-second-team All-Americans.

Player	Pos.	Year
Carl Chadwick	FW	1909
C. M. Browne	GK	1911
Quincy Greene	FW	1911
Morris Hallowell	MF	1912
Kenneth Crooks	DF	1926
John Bland	MF	1928
Alex Stollmeyer	DF	1929

Player	Pos.	Year
Paul Catinella	DF	1930
John Carrigan	FW	1930
Theodore Roosevelt III	MF	1934
George Stork	FW	1935
Charles Weiss	DF	1949
Andy Kydes	MF	1966
Phil Kydes	FW	1971
Andre Akpan	FW	2007
Mike Fucito	FW	2007, 2008

=== Third Team All-Americans ===
Harvard has fielded three third-team All-Americans.

Player	Position	Year
Tony Marks	DF	1966
Nick Hotchkin	FW	1987
Kevin Ara	FW	2002

== Coaches ==
=== Current staff ===
Position	Name
Head coach	Josh Shapiro
Assistant coach	Jordie Ciuffetelli
Assistant coach	Bryan Harkin
Goalkeepers coach	Morgan Sawyer

=== Historical head coaches ===
Year	Name	Sea.	Record
1905–10	(no coach) (Note: Teams were coached by their captains.)	6	9-19-5
1911–16, 1921	Charles Burgess	7	54-33-10
1922–23	William R. Welsh	2	5-12-1
1924–26	Thomas B. White	3	9-11-4
1927–28	John Kershaw	2	9-9-3
1929–40	John F. Carr	12	63-22-19
1941–47	James McDonald	7	18-12-6
1948–73	J. Bruce Munro	26	180-87-27
1974–81	George Ford	8	47-51-15

Year	Name	Sea.	Record
1982–86	Jape Shattuck	5	44-29-8
1987–91	Mike Getman	5	42-26-9
1992–98	Stephen Locker	7	54-45-13
1999–2007	John Kerr	9	81-59-13
2008–09	Jamie Clark	2	26-10-1
2010–12	Carl Junot	3	6-30-11
2013–19	Pieter Lehrer	7	42-58-13
2020–present	Josh Shapiro	4	22-14-14

== Team honors ==
=== National championships ===
Title n°	Year	Class	Organizer	Record	Coach
1	1913	Tournament	ISFA	9–6–3	Charles Burgess
2	1914	Tournament	ISFA	6–1–2	Charles Burgess
3	1926	Tournament	ISFA	4–2–2	Thomas B. White
4	1930	Tournament	ISFA	8–1–0	John F. Carr

=== Conference championships ===
Harvard has won 13 Ivy League championships. The Ivy League began sponsoring men's varsity soccer in 1955. Prior to 1955, Harvard competed as an Independent.

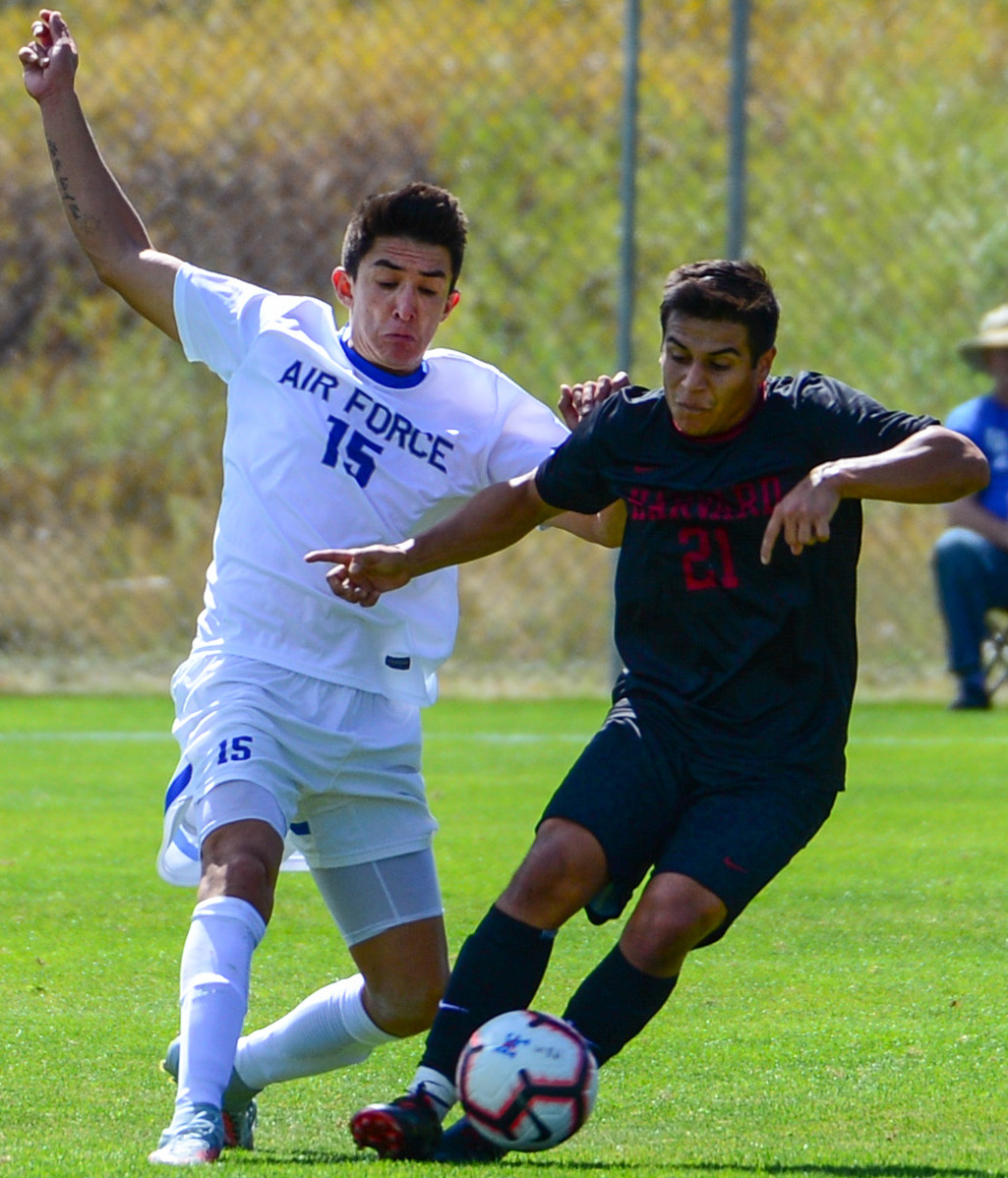
Harvard (in black) playing v Air Force in 2018

Title n°	Year	Conf.	Class	Coach	Overall record	Conference record
1	1955	Ivy	Regular season	J. Bruce Munro	10–2–0	5–1–0
2	1958	Ivy	Regular season	J. Bruce Munro	10–2–1	5–1–1
3	1959	Ivy	Regular season	J. Bruce Munro	9–1–3	5–1–0
4	1961	Ivy	Regular season	J. Bruce Munro	8–2–1	5–1–1
5	1962	Ivy	Regular season	J. Bruce Munro	6–5–0	5–2–0
6	1963	Ivy	Regular season	J. Bruce Munro	8–2–0	6–0–0
7	1969	Ivy	Regular season	J. Bruce Munro	14–1–0	7–0–0
8	1970	Ivy	Regular season	J. Bruce Munro	12–1–0	7–0–0
9	1987	Ivy	Regular season	Mike Getman	14–1–3	6–0–1
10	1994	Ivy	Regular season	Stephen Locker	5–9–2	5–1–1
11	1996	Ivy	Regular season	Stephen Locker	16–2–0	6–1–0
12	2006	Ivy	Regular season	John Kerr Jr.	14–5–1	6–0–1
13	2009	Ivy	Regular season	Jamie Clark	14–4–1	5–1–1

== Rivalries ==
Harvard athletics have a longstanding rivalry with Yale across all sports since 1875, and it also translates to the men's soccer programs.

Both programs have faced each other on an annual basis since 1907. As of Nov 2023, the Crimson lead the series against the Bulldogs 54–42–13.

== See also ==
- Harvard Crimson
