= Cornell Big Red men's soccer =

Men's soccer program at Cornell University

- Founded: 1908; 118 years ago
- University: Cornell University
- Head coach: John Smith (3rd season)
- Conference: Ivy
- Location: Ithaca, New York, US
- Stadium: Charles F. Berman Field (capacity: 1,000)
- Nickname: Big Red
- Colors: Carnelian red and white
Home	Away

Pre-tournament ISFA/ISFL championships
- 1934

NCAA tournament College Cup
- 1972

NCAA tournament Quarterfinals
- 1972, 1975

NCAA tournament Round of 16
- 1971, 1972, 1974, 1975, 1977, 2022

NCAA tournament Round of 32
- 1971, 1972, 1974, 1975, 1976, 1977, 1980, 1995, 1996, 2022, 2024, 2026

NCAA tournament appearances
- 1971, 1972, 1974, 1975, 1976, 1977, 1980, 1995, 1996, 2012, 2022, 2024, 2025, 2026

Conference tournament championships
- 2026

Conference regular season championships
- 1975, 1977, 1995, 2012, 2026

The Cornell Big Red men's soccer program represents the Cornell University in all NCAA Division I men's college soccer competitions. Founded in 1908, the Big Red compete in the Ivy League. The Big Red are coached by John Smith, a former professional player and assistant coach for the Stanford Cardinal men's soccer program. Cornell plays their home matches at Charles F. Berman Field.

== History ==
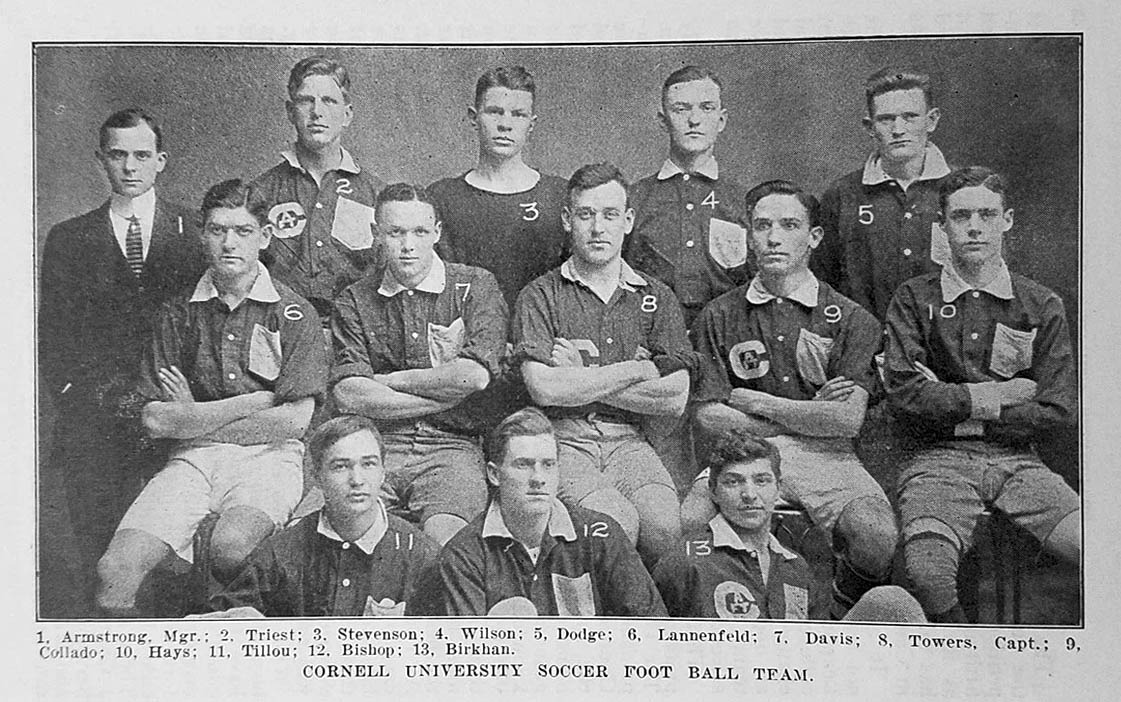
Cornell team of 1910

Cornell's soccer team was formed in 1908, and the university started its run on the sport competing in championships organized by the Intercollegiate Soccer Football Association (ISFA), the predecessor national soccer championship to the NCAA soccer tournament.

The team's first coach was Talbot Hunter (six years later the team was established), who leaded the team between 1914 and 1915.

The Big Red won only a national title in 1934, the team's 27th. season in the competition. Under the coaching of Nick Bawlf, the 1934 season was the most successful one in Cornell men's soccer history, going undefeated with a 5-0-2 record. Results of the season include victories over Hamilton (5–1), Penn (3–0), Swarthmore (2–1), Princeton (2–0), Leigh (2–1), and ties to Dartmouth and Haverford (both 1–1).

It was the only season in Cornell men's soccer history where the program finished the campaign with an undefeated record.

== Players ==
=== Current roster ===
As of 16 Sep 2024

Note: Flags indicate national team as defined under FIFA eligibility rules; some limited exceptions apply. Players may hold more than one non-FIFA nationality.

No.	Pos.	Nation	Player
0	GK	USA	Ryan Thompson
1	GK	USA	Ryan Friedberg
2	DF	USA	Kisa Kiingi
3	DF	USA	Justin Melly
4	DF	MEX	Mateo Rodríguez
5	FW	USA	Nate Hovan
6	MF	USA	Sam Latona
7	FW	USA	Alioune Ka
9	FW	USA	Alex Harris
10	MF	ENG	Daniel Samways
11	MF	HUN	Balazs Feher
12	MF	USA	Sahyd Nevado
13	FW	USA	Will Carnevale
14	FW	USA	Adam Schaban
15	FW	ISL	Jon Snider
16	FW	USA	Matthew Hutchison
17	FW	USA	Patricio Parra

No.	Pos.	Nation	Player
18	MF	USA	Cody Torgovnik
19	FW	ENG	Danny Lokko
21	FW	USA	Liam May
22	MF	USA	Ben Goulding
23	MF	USA	Westin Carnevale
24	DF	USA	Andrew Johnson
25	MF	USA	Eddie Stewart
26	DF	USA	Aidan Martin
27	DF	USA	Griffin Eck
28	FW	CYP	Giorgos Diakos
29	DF	USA	Bennett Wehibe
30	GK	USA	Isaac Delgado
31	MF	USA	Dominik Kolbl
32	MF	USA	Campbell Reece
33	DF	USA	Fernando Garate
34	DF	USA	Colin Johnson

== Team honors ==
=== National championships ===
- ISFA National Champion (1): 1934

=== Conference championships ===
- Ivy League (5): 1975*, 1977, 1995*, 2012, 2026
- Ivy League Tournament Champions: 2026

(* shared title)

== Individual honors ==
The following players have been awarded as All-Americans by United Soccer Coaches or Intercollegiate Soccer Football Association.

=== First-Team All Americans ===
Year	Player	Year
1910	T.M. Stephenson	GK
1911	M. Davis	MF
1912	Robert Davis	MF
1914	Howard Lynch	MF
1914	Clarence Dyer	MF
1915	Frank Thomas	DF
1917	Russell Iler	DF
1917	George Dibble	MF
1921	Hugh Fates	DF
1921	Elliot Thompson	MF
1921	Francis Righter	FW
1921	Eduardo Elli	FW
1922	Elliot Thompson	MF
1922	Francis Righter	FW
1926	Chien Hsu	DF
1928	George Olditch	FW
1930	James Donovan	MF
1932	Louis Bernejillo	MF
1933	Louis Bernejillo	MF
1936	William Hershey	FW
1937	Leonard Darling	FW
1938	Eugene Crosby	FW
1939	John Perry	DF
1940	Robert Ochs	GK
1944	Edward McDonough	DF
1948	Charles Berman	FW
1950	Derl Derr	FW
1951	George Boateng	FW
1957	Josh Nelson	DF
1967	Nikos Alexandridis	FW
1973	Kip Jordan	DF
2012	Daniel Haber	FW

=== Second-Team All-Americans ===
Year	Player	Year
1909	Carlos Collado	DF
1909	Alan Towers	MF
1927	Gibson Allen	GK
1927	Chien Hsu	DF
1929	Egbert Cory	FW
1930	Orlando Carvalho	FW
1934	Bo Ivar Adlerbert	DF
1934	Hendrick Versluis	FW
1935	Sidney Nathanson	FW
1938	John Perry	DF
1939	I. Robert Wood	GK
1939	David Podrisky	FW
1940	John Perry	MF
1940	Robert Taylor	FW
1941	Gordon Blatz	FW
1943	Merill Hunter	DF
1943	Charles Cox	GK
1943	Robert Prince	FW
1944	William Matchneer	GK
1944	George Bailey	FW
1948	Derl Derr	FW
1949	Gunter Meng	FW
1950	Gunter Meng	FW
1957	Al Stratta	FW
1959	Ron Maierhofer	FW
1965	Seth Dei	FW
1974	Jon Ross	GK
1980	Kurt Bettger	DF
1996	Rob Elliott	MF

=== Third-Team All-Americans ===
Year	Player	Year
1995	Eric Kusseluk	FW

== Seasons ==
=== Year-by-year ===
The Big Red have sponsored varsity soccer for 111 seasons. They have a combined record of 510–545–148.

=== NCAA Tournament history ===
Cornell has appeared in 13 NCAA Tournaments and has a cumulative record of 11-12-1. Their most recent appearance came in 2025.
