= Brown Bears men's soccer =

American college soccer team

- Founded: 1926; 100 years ago
- University: Brown University
- Head coach: Chase Wileman (2nd season)
- Conference: Ivy
- Location: Providence, Rhode Island
- Stadium: Stevenson-Pincince Field (capacity: 3,500)
- Nickname: Bears
- Colors: Seal brown, cardinal red, and white
Home	Away

NCAA tournament College Cup
- 1968, 1971, 1973, 1975

NCAA tournament appearances
- 1963, 1965, 1968, 1969, 1970, 1971, 1972, 1973, 1974, 1975, 1976, 1977, 1978, 1994, 1995, 1997, 1998, 1999, 2000, 2003, 2005, 2006, 2007, 2009, 2010, 2011, 2012

Conference tournament championships
- 1963, 1964, 1965, 1966, 1967, 1968, 1973, 1974, 1975, 1976, 1994, 1995, 1997, 1998, 2000, 2001, 2003, 2005, 2007, 2011

The Brown Bears men's soccer team represents Brown University in men's Division I NCAA competitions. They compete in the Ivy League. The Bears have been semifinalists in the NCAA tournament in 1968, 1973, and 1975. They also finished in fourth place in 1977. They are coached by Chase Wileman who has been head coach since 2022.

Brown is the most winning team in the Conference with 20 Ivy League tournament titles won.

== Roster ==
As of May 10, 2021

Note: Flags indicate national team as defined under FIFA eligibility rules; some limited exceptions apply. Players may hold more than one non-FIFA nationality.

No.	Pos.	Nation	Player
1	GK	GER	Henrik Weiper
2	DF	USA	Iyke Dafe
3	MF	USA	Tanner Barry
4	DF	USA	Harri Sprofera
4	DF	USA	Taha Kina
6	MF	USA	Scott Gustafson
7	FW	USA	Lorenzo Amaral
8	MF	USA	Jack Cloherty
9	FW	USA	Carlo Brown
10	MF	USA	Charlie Adams
11	FW	USA	Jamin Gogo Peters
12	MF	DEN	Mads Stistrup Petersen
13	DF	USA	Keegan Walpole
14	FW	USA	Mike Balleani
15	MF	USA	Langdon Gryglas
16	DF	USA	Shayne Thompson
17	DF	USA	Gavin Tabije

No.	Pos.	Nation	Player
18	MF	USA	Zion Wharton
19	FW	USA	Dylan Ellis
20	MF	USA	Adolfo Diaz
21	FW	USA	Timi Browne
22	DF	USA	Heechan Han
23	FW	USA	Diego Elizalde
24	MF	USA	Kyle Gee
25	FW	USA	Greyson Mitchell
26	MF	USA	Andre Romo
27	MF	USA	Levi Pillar
28	DF	USA	Carter Smith
29	MF	USA	Cal Walsh
30	DF	USA	Stefano DAgostini
31	GK	USA	Connor Smith
32	GK	USA	Max Pfaffman
34	MF	USA	James Snaith

== Notable alumni ==
- (United States) Ben Brewster
- (United States) Chris Fox
- (United States) Cory Gibbs
- (United States) Jeff Larentowicz
- (United States) Thomas McNamara
- (United States) Fred Pereira
- (United States) Steve Ralbovsky
- (United States) Dylan Remick

== Honours ==
- Ivy League tournament (20): 1963, 1964, 1965, 1966, 1967, 1968, 1973, 1974, 1975, 1976, 1994, 1995, 1997, 1998, 2000, 2001, 2003, 2004, 2007, 2011

== See also ==
- Brown Bears
