= Dartmouth Big Green men's soccer =

American college soccer team

- Founded: 1915; 111 years ago
- University: Dartmouth College
- Head coach: Bo Oshoniyi (2nd season)
- Conference: Ivy
- Location: Hanover, New Hampshire, US
- Stadium: Burnham Field (capacity: 1,600)
- Nickname: Big Green
- Colors: Dartmouth green and white
Home	Away

NCAA tournament Quarterfinals
- 1964, 1990, 1992

NCAA tournament Round of 16
- 1964, 1990, 1992, 2008, 2010

NCAA tournament Round of 32
- 1964, 1990, 1992, 2005, 2008, 2010, 2014, 2015, 2016, 2017

NCAA tournament appearances
- 1964, 1977, 1978, 1988, 1992, 1997, 2000, 2002, 2004, 2005, 2007, 2008, 2009, 2010, 2011, 2014, 2015, 2016, 2017

Conference Regular Season championships
- 1964, 1988, 1992, 2002, 2004, 2005, 2008, 2011, 2014, 2015, 2016, 2017

The Dartmouth Big Green men's soccer program represents the Dartmouth College in all NCAA Division I men's college soccer competitions. Founded in 1915, the Big Green compete in the Ivy League. The Big Green are coached by Bo Oshoniyi, who has coached the program since 2018. The Big Green plays their home matches at Burnham Field, on the Dartmouth campus.

== History ==
Dartmouth's soccer origins can be traced to the Old division football, a medieval football game played from the 1820s to around 1890 by Dartmouth students. The game involved unlimited sides made up variously of the members of the two literary societies on campus. Every year a special match sometimes called the "Usual Game of Foot Ball" occurred early in the fall in which the sophomores took on the freshmen.

The university fielded its first soccer team in 1915, achieving a 1–1–0 record. Dartmouth participated in the national championships organised by the Intercollegiate Soccer Football Association (ISFA), the predecessor national soccer championship to the NCAA soccer tournament.

The team won its first Ivy League championship in 1964, with a 5–2–0 record. As conference champions, Dartmouth earned their place at the 1964 NCAA soccer tournament, but lost in first round v Trinity 2–1.

== Players ==
=== Current roster ===
As of November 11, 2025

Note: Flags indicate national team as defined under FIFA eligibility rules; some limited exceptions apply. Players may hold more than one non-FIFA nationality.

No.	Pos.	Nation	Player
00	GK	GRE	Konstantinos Dellas
0	GK	USA	TJ Jeffreys
2	DF	FRA	Alexis Huneau
3	DF	ENG	Daniel Carey-Evans
4	MF	USA	Nick Kashambuzi
5	DF	CYP	Panagiotis Karagiorgis
6	MF	CYP	Symeon Hadjigeorgiou
8	MF	ENG	Olly Spicer
9	FW	SWE	Douglas Arveskär
10	FW	GRE	Vasilis Moiras
11	FW	USA	Trenton Blake
12	FW	CYP	Marios Tziortzis
13	DF	USA	Benny Rolla-Mullis

No.	Pos.	Nation	Player
14	FW	USA	Noah Sams
16	MF	ISL	Oskar Magnusson
17	FW	CAN	James Wilson
18	DF	DOM	Sebastián Mañón
19	FW	ISL	Eidur Baldvinsson
20	MF	GHA	Raphael Oppong
21	MF	ENG	Cameron Brayne
22	DF	USA	Hudson Kohler
23	FW	USA	Will Lulka
24	DF	USA	Sam Fenton
27	MF	CRC	Raul Vargas
29	MF	CRC	Raul Vargas
40	MF	UAE	Milo Peters

== Individuals honors ==
=== All-Americans coaches ===
Number of awards won, in brackets:

Year	Player(s)
1941	Richard Geppart, Gordon Smith
1943	Charles Stebbins
1944	Jim Osborne Jr., Robert Roberts, Herbert Van Ingen
1946	Al Bildner, Leland Fancher
1950	Jackson Hall
1951	Jackson Hall (2)
1952	Jackson Hall (3), John Rice
1953	Bob Drawbaugh, Carl Hirsch
1958	David Blake
1962	Robert Mattoon, David Smoyer
1967	Leon Myrianthopoulos
1968	Charles Silcox

Year	Player(s)
1969	Charles Silcox (2)
1979	Paul Mott
1990	Danny Sankar, John Milne
1991	John Milne (2)
1992	Justin Head
1994	Ian Saward
1998	Bobby Meyer
2008	Craig Henderson
2009	Daniel Keat
2016	Wyatt Omsberg
2017	Wyatt Omsberg (2)

== Ivy League honors ==
The following Dartmouth men's soccer players and coaches have earned Ivy League individual honors.

=== Players of the Year ===
Year	Player
1998	Doug MacGinnitie
1992	Justin Head
2008	Craig Henderson
2011	Lucky Mkosana
2015	Stefan Cleveland
2016	Wyatt Omsberg
2017	Wyatt Omsberg (2)

=== Rookies of the Year ===
Year	Player
1988	John Milne
1992	David Moran
2000	Matt LaBarre
2002	Doug Carr
2008	Lucky Mkosana
2015	Amadu Kunateh
2017	Dawson McCartney

=== Coaches of the Year ===
Year	Player
2014	Chad Riley
2015	Chad Riley (2)
2017	Chad Riley (3)

== Coaching history and records ==
There have been 11 coaches in Dartmouth Soccer's history.

#	Coach	Tenure	S	W	L	T	Pct.
1	W.C. Hubert	1919–1920	2	4	3	0	.571
2	J.C. Roule	1921–1923	3	7	8	1	.469
3	Thomas Dent	1924–1959	35	143	111	22	.558
4	Whitey Burnham	1960–1969	10	45	57	5	.444
5	George Beim	1970–1973	4	11	30	5	.293
6	Thomas Griffith	1974–1984	11	55	78	18	.424
7	Bobby Clark	1985–1993	9	82	42	13	.646
8	Fran O'Leary	1994–2000	7	56	48	14	.537
9	Jeff Cook	2001–2012	12	106	74	31	.576
10	Chad Riley	2013–2017	4	51	26	14	.637
11	Bo Oshoniyi	2018–present	1	7	5	5	

== Titles ==
=== Conference ===
- Ivy League (12): 1964, 1988, 1992, 2002, 2004, 2005, 2008, 2011, 2014, 2015, 2016, 2017
