= Princeton Tigers men's soccer =

American college soccer team

- Founded: 1906; 120 years ago (Note: Although Princeton states to have fielded its first soccer team in 1906, the first de facto college football game held in 1869 between Ruters and Princeton Universities (with rules based on The Football Association) is considered the first "not official" collegiate soccer match and the birth of the sport in the United States.)
- University: Princeton University
- Head coach: Jim Barlow
- Conference: Ivy
- Location: Princeton, New Jersey, US
- Stadium: Roberts Stadium (capacity: 1,000)
- Nickname: Tigers
- Colors: Black and orange
Home	Away

Pre-tournament ISFA/ISFL championships
- 1921, 1922, 1925, 1926, 1927, 1936, 1937, 1939

NCAA tournament College Cup
- 1993

NCAA tournament Quarterfinals
- 1993

NCAA tournament Round of 16
- 1977, 1979, 1993

NCAA tournament appearances
- 1977, 1979, 1989, 1993, 1995, 1999, 2001, 2009, 2010, 2021, 2024, 2025

Conference tournament championships
- 2024

Conference regular season championships
- 1957, 1960, 1988, 1993, 1999, 2001, 2010, 2014, 2018, 2021

The Princeton Tigers men's soccer team is an intercollegiate varsity sports team of Princeton University. The team is a member of the Ivy League of the National Collegiate Athletic Association. The Tigers are coached by Jim Barlow.

The team is one of the oldest active soccer clubs in the United States, playing their first official match in November 1906. The team was once coached by former U.S. national team coach and former Swansea City manager, Bob Bradley.

== History ==
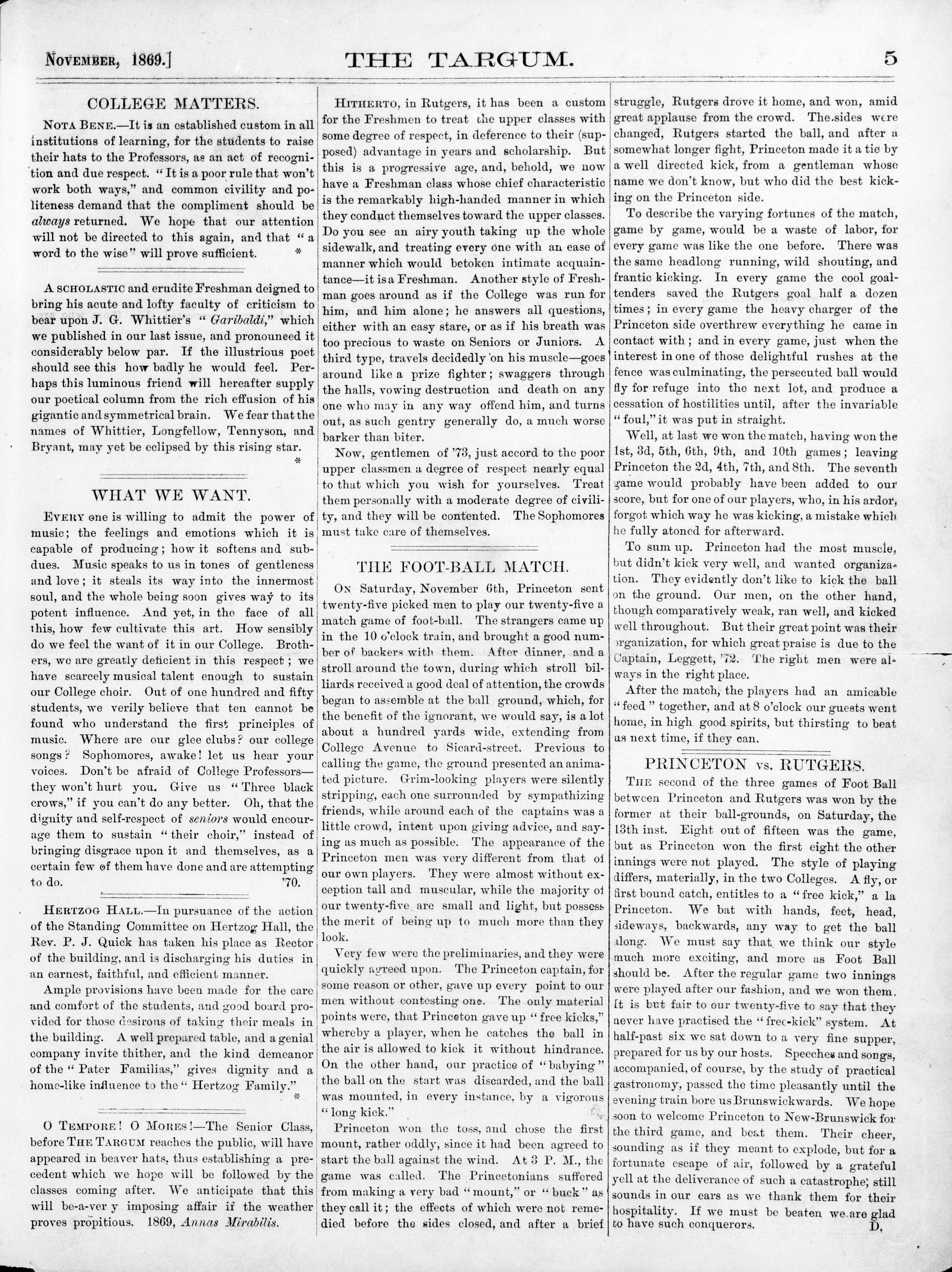
"The Foot-Ball Match", Chronicle of the first game at The Targum, Nov 1869

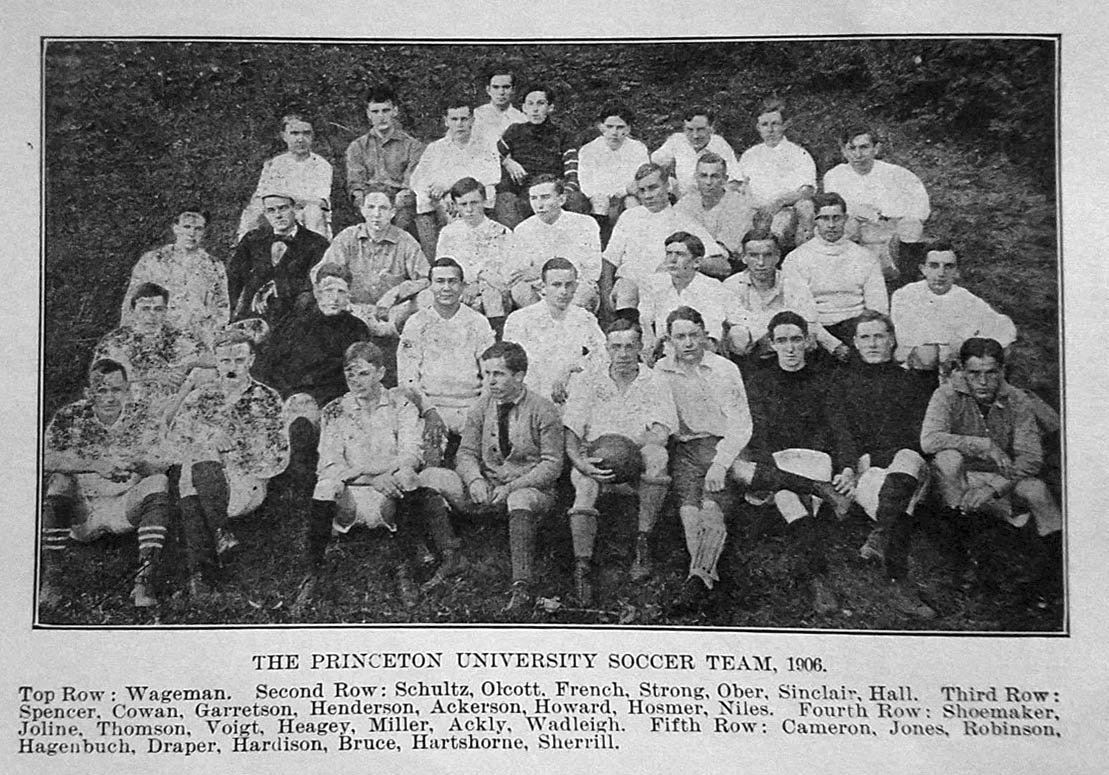
Princeton squad of 1906, the first year the University fielded a team

The origins of Princeton soccer trace back to 1869, where the first ever collegiate football game was played in the United States. The then-College of New Jersey (now Princeton University) and the Rutgers College (now Rutgers University) played an exhibition match that was won by Rutgers 6–4.

In addition to being considered one of the earliest soccer games reported in the United States, these two games are considered to be the first organized American college football games to ever be played.

Princeton's first varsity team was fielded in 1906, nevertheless there are no supporting documents of the team's results from the 1906–1937 period. Jimmy Reed was the coach of team from 1938 (or before) to 1966.

== Players ==
=== Current roster ===
As of 7 Sep 2024

Note: Flags indicate national team as defined under FIFA eligibility rules; some limited exceptions apply. Players may hold more than one non-FIFA nationality.

No.	Pos.	Nation	Player
0	GK	USA	William Watson
0	GK	USA	Khamari Hadaway
3	MF	USA	Cyrus Klinenberg
4	MF	USA	Jack Hunt
5	MF	USA	Liam Beckwith
6	FW	USA	Harry Roberts
7	FW	USA	Kevin Kelley
8	DF	USA	James Wangsness
9	FW	USA	Ian Nunez
10	FW	USA	Nico Nee
11	FW	ENG	Daniel Ittycheria
12	MF	USA	Heyward Bryan
13	FW	USA	Will Francis
14	MF	USA	Jack Jasinski
15	FW	USA	Roka Tsunehara

No.	Pos.	Nation	Player
17	MF	USA	Bardia Hormozi
18	MF	USA	Sam Vigilante
19	MF	USA	Will Travis
20	MF	USA	Gabriel Duchovny
21	MF	USA	Kristian Kelley
22	DF	USA	Ian MacIver
23	DF	USA	Dash Papez
24	DF	USA	Sebastian Swary
25	DF	USA	Stephen Duncan
27	GK	USA	Andrew Samuels
28	GK	USA	Sully Atkin
29	FW	USA	Nico Nee
30	MF	USA	Garry Zhang
33	DF	USA	Issa Mudashiru
34	DF	USA	Giuliano Fravolini

=== Notable alumni ===
- (United States) Matt Behncke
- (United States) Bob Bradley
- (France) Antoine Hoppenot
- (United States) Jesse Marsch
- (United States) Kevin O'Toole

== Coaching history ==
Period	Coach	Record
1906–1908	(no information)	
1909	J. Duncan Spaeth	2–4–0
1910–1915	(no information)	
1915–1917	Holden	11–7–5
1918	(no information)	
1919–1934	Al Nies	76–38–19
1935–1937	Bill Logan	17–6–3
1938–1966	Jimmy Reed	136–95–29
1967–1972	Jack Volz	30–33–6
1973–1983	Bill Muse	84–51–22
1984–1995	Bob Bradley	92–80–15
1996–present	Jim Barlow	

== Titles ==
=== National ===
Association	Championship	Titles	Winning years
ISFA	Championship	8	1921, 1922, 1925, 1926, 1927
Middle Atlantic (Note: Complete name:"Middle Atlantic Intercollegiate Soccer League".)	Championship	3	1936, 1937, 1939, 1940, 1942, 1946 (Note: Title shared with Penn.)

=== Conference ===
Conference	Championship	Titles	Winning years
Ivy League	Tournament	2	2024, 2025
Ivy League	Regular season	11	1957, 1960, 1988, 1993, 1999, 2001, 2010, 2014, 2018, 2021, 2025
