= Colin Miller (cricketer) =

Australian cricketer (born 1964)

Personal information
- Full name: Colin Reid Miller
- Born: 6 February 1964 (age 62); Footscray, Victoria, Australia
- Nickname: Funky
- Height: 180 cm (5 ft 11 in)
- Batting: Right-handed
- Bowling: Right-arm fast-medium Right-arm off break
- Role: Bowler

International information
- National side: Australia (1998–2001)
- Test debut (cap 379): 1 October 1998 v Pakistan
- Last Test: 18 March 2001 v India

Domestic team information
- Years: Team
- 1986: Victoria
- 1989–1991: South Australia
- 1992–2000: Tasmania
- 2000–2002: Victoria

Career statistics
Competition	Test	FC	LA
Matches	18	126	49
Runs scored	174	1,533	239
Batting average	8.28	12.88	10.86
100s/50s	0/0	0/3	0/0
Top score	43	62	32
Balls bowled	4,091	29,183	2,653
Wickets	69	446	49
Bowling average	26.15	30.97	37.40
5 wickets in innings	3	16	0
10 wickets in match	1	3	0
Best bowling	5/32	7/49	4/36
Catches/stumpings	6/–	39/–	10/–
- Source: CricketArchive

Colin Reid Miller (born 6 February 1964) is an Australian former cricketer who played 18 Tests for Australia between 1998 and 2001. In May 2002, Miller announced his retirement from cricket.

Miller was a bowler capable of performing effectively either as a right-arm fast-medium or off break bowler and achieved a Test average of 26.15. A tailend batsman who made three fifties in 126 first-class matches, he is particularly remembered for appearing with his hair dyed blue in a Test match against the West Indies in 2001.

== Playing career ==
Born in Footscray, Melbourne, Miller played two games for Victoria in 1985–86, but unable to command a regular place in the state team he moved to South Australia, where he played from 1988–89 to 1991–92. He then moved to Tasmania, where he played from 1992–93 to 1999–2000, before returning to Victoria for 2000–01 and 2001–02. In the 1997–98 season he took 70 wickets at 24.98, including his best innings figures of 7 for 49, when he bowled unchanged throughout Victoria's second innings.

Miller began as a right-arm fast-medium bowler, but changed to right-arm offbreak spin after an ankle injury. He mixed both styles with considerable success, and was a surprise addition to the Australian Test team at the age of 34, being able to act both as the second spin bowler and the third pace bowler. He played Test cricket principally as an off-spinner, and took 69 wickets at an average of 26.15. His best innings and match figures came in the Third Test against West Indies in Adelaide in 2000–01, when he took 5 for 81 and 5 for 32. He won the award for the Australian Test Player of the Year in 2001.

He toured England with Australia A in 1998, then toured Pakistan with the senior Australian side in 1998–99, making his Test debut. He also toured West Indies, Sri Lanka, Zimbabwe, New Zealand, India and England with the Test team.

He played with blue hair in a Test match against the West Indies in 2001. His hair apparently made West Indies captain Courtney Walsh laugh.

He retired from first-class cricket in 2002.

Miller played for Chorley Cricket Club as the Pro in 1986, Rawtenstall in the Lancashire League in 1990 and 1991, finishing 1990 with 1078 runs and 100 wickets and 1991 with 780 runs and 108 wickets. During the 1997 and 1998 (European) summers, Miller played in the Netherlands for HCC Rood en Wit (transl. Red and White) and apart from taking many wickets was also very successful with the bat.

== Coaching career ==
He coached the Katandra Cricket Club in the Shepparton Cricket Association in 2004–05. He was short listed for the job of Bangladesh's head coach following the 2007 Cricket World Cup but he was later ruled out of the position.

In 2013, USACA chief executive Darren Beazley announced Miller as a USACA ambassador for cricket. In 2004, he was one of several former international cricketers to sign up and play in Pro Cricket, a Twenty20 domestic professional league in the USA that folded after one season.

== Statistics ==
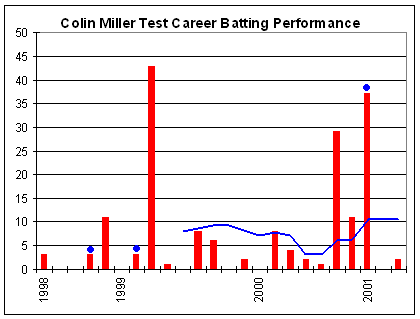
Miller's Test career batting performance.
