= Cricket in the United States =

- Country: United States
- Governing body: USA Cricket
- National team: United States
- First played: before 1700

National competitions
- Major League Cricket; Minor League Cricket

International competitions
- World Cricket League; ICC World Cup Qualifier; ICC Men's T20 World Cup; ICC Under-19 Cricket World Cup

Cricket in the United States is a sport played at the amateur, club, intercollegiate and international competition levels with rising popularity, with over 300,000 players across the country. Major League Cricket (MLC) is the highest level of domestic Twenty20 cricket currently played in America. Much of the recent growth in American cricket has been in the T20 format.

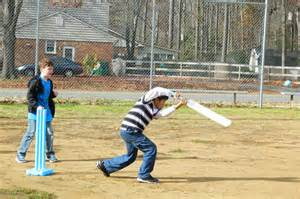
A Sri Lankan-American child playing cricket in Virginia

In 2006, it was estimated that 30,000 people in the United States play or watch cricket annually. By 2017, this figure had risen to 200,000 people playing cricket in 6,000 teams. Cricket in the United States is not as popular as baseball and is not as popular as it is in the major cricket playing nations. There are at least two historical reasons for the relative obscurity of cricket in the United States:

- The 19th-century rise of the summer time bat-and-ball sport now called baseball, which displaced cricket as a popular pastime.
- In 1909, when the ICC was originally organized as the Imperial Cricket Conference, it was open only to Commonwealth nations and thereby excluded the U.S. from participating in the sport at the highest level.

Nevertheless, in 1965 the U.S. was admitted to the renamed ICC as an associate member and the sport grew in popularity in the second half of the 20th century. An important reason for the growing popularity of cricket is the growing population of immigrants to the U.S. who come from cricket playing nations.

With the launching of the United States Youth Cricket Association in 2010, a more focused effort to bring the game to American schools was begun, with the intention of broadening cricket's fan base beyond expatriates and their children. In addition, USA Cricket has begun offering various championship tournaments for youth cricketers, such as the MLC Jr. Championship.

ESPN has been stepping up its coverage of cricket in recent years, buying the cricket website Cricinfo in 2007, and broadcasting the final of the 2014 ICC World Twenty20 competition, the 2014 Indian Premier League, English County Championship games, and international Test cricket.

In 2021, Minor League Cricket (MiLC), a professional Twenty20 cricket league sanctioned by USA Cricket, began play. Major League Cricket launched its first season in 2023.

== History ==
=== Early history ===
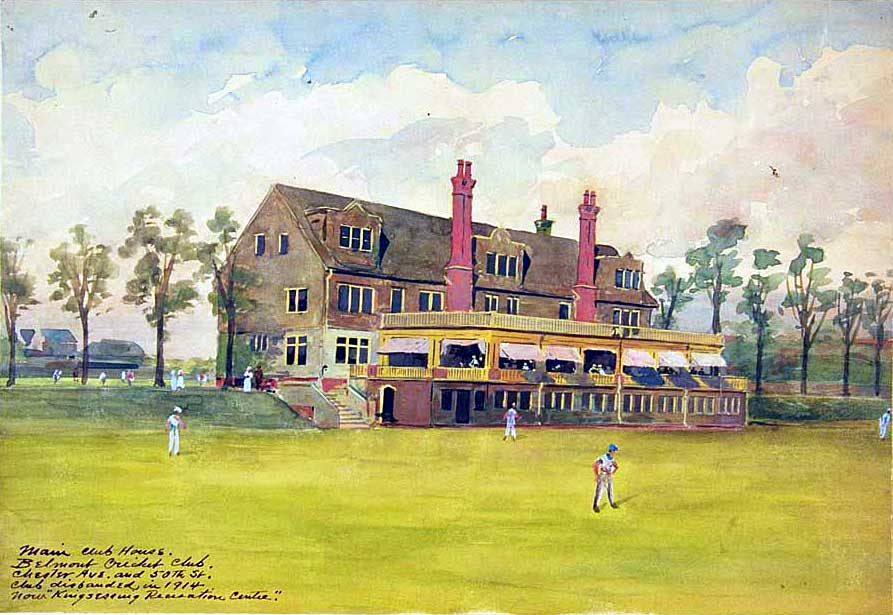
A watercolor painting of the main clubhouse of the Belmont Cricket Club

Cricket was being played by British colonists such as William Byrd II in the early 18th century. According to Byrd's diary, cricket was played on the slave plantations of Virginia, including on his Westover estate among neighbors and slaves. A New York newspaper from 1739 contains an advertisement for cricket players. The first match to be documented in the U.S. was recorded in 1751 in Manhattan.

Philadelphia is typically considered to be the center of North American cricket, with a long history of teams and matches. Cricket was played at Haverford College briefly in the late 1830s, and was revived there in 1856. Haverford and the University of Pennsylvania formed a strong rivalry, with the first match played on May 7, 1864, believed to be start of the third-oldest intercollegiate sporting contest in America, after the 1852 Harvard-Yale crew and 1859 Amherst-Williams baseball matches. In 1881, Penn, Harvard College, Haverford College, Princeton College (then known as College of New Jersey), and Columbia College formed The Intercollegiate Cricket Association, which Cornell University later joined.

Eleven-person team cricket took root most effectively at the St. George's Cricket Club, founded in 1838. Clubs from the United States (St. George's CC) and Canada participated in one of the first international cricket matches on record in 1844 in Bloomingdale Park in Manhattan. Cricket received a significant amount of media coverage at the time. It is probable that in 1860 there were 10,000 boys and men in America who had actively played the sport for at least a season.

=== Rise of baseball ===
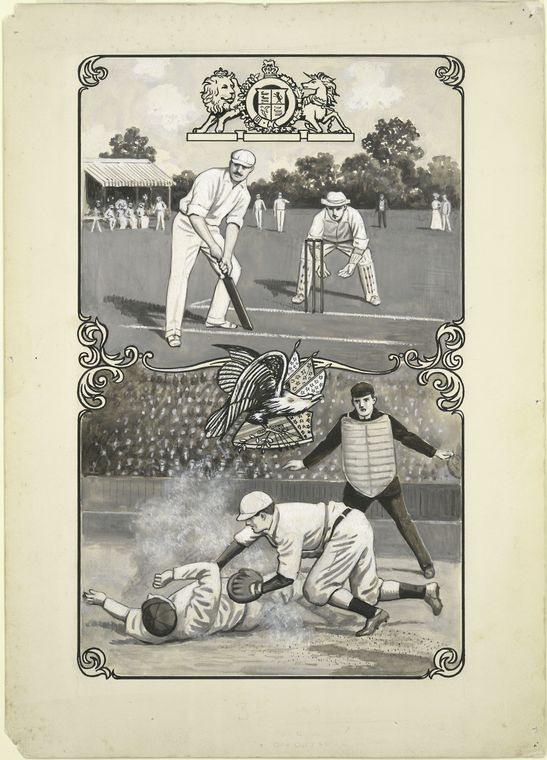
A depiction of cricket (top) and baseball (bottom)

St. George's CC employed Sheffield native Samuel Wright as its professional cricket playing groundsman. Wright's two sons, Harry and George, played for the United States XXII against the All England XI in 1859 in New York and Philadelphia. Both Wright brothers became renowned in baseball circles after they played for the Cincinnati Red Stockings, America's first professional baseball team. Lord Hawke's England XI played George Wright's New England Cricket XI at the Longwood Country Club in Boston. On the same tour in 1891 Lord Hawke's XI defeated a Germantown CC XI in Philadelphia, which included George Patterson, regarded as America's best batsman and compared to England's W.G. Grace, with several centuries to his credit.

It may have been during the Civil War that baseball overtook cricket and secured its place as America's game. An army making a brief stop at a location could easily organise a game of baseball on almost any clear patch of ground, while cricket required a carefully prepared pitch. After the Civil War, baseball became a much more organized sport than cricket in America, with more money and competition available to baseball players across the country; thus, baseball began to poach players and administrators from the world of cricket. It has been suggested that the fast-paced quick play of baseball was more appealing to Americans than the technical slower game of cricket, which at the time was played over a much longer duration than baseball; some attempts were made in this regard to nativize cricket in a way that would reduce its length and other perceived disadvantages relative to baseball, as can be seen in the American innovation of wicket, a cricket variant which could be played in an afternoon. However, the natural tendency toward baseball was compounded by terrible American defeats at the hands of a traveling English side in 1859, which may have caused Americans to think that they would never be successful at this English game.

By the end of the Civil War, most cricket fans had given up their hopes of broad-based support for the game. Baseball filled the role of the "people's game" and cricket became an amateur game for gentlemen.

=== Contemporary era ===
The governance of American cricket has come under question a few times in the early 21st century, with the current organizer USA Cricket having received Associate status from the ICC in 2019.

== Governing bodies ==
The United States of America Cricket Association (USACA) previously served as the governing body for cricket in the United States, as an associate member of the ICC from 1965 to 2017. The USACA faced turmoil and governance issues in the 2000s and early 2010s. In 2005 the USACA was suspended from the ICC's annual conference due to issues with the association's election process, but that suspension was lifted in March 2006. In February 2006, a competing commercial body, Major League Cricket (MLC) proposed that it replace the USACA as the United States' representative in the ICC. It cited its more substantial efforts in developing the sport in the country (especially at grassroots levels such as schools, which the USACA had ignored) and accused the USACA of having "the morbid opinion that they do not need any outside assistance whereas the development of the game."

The USACA was suspended by the ICC in 2007 for its failure to adopt a constitution and hold elections in a timely manner. The U.S. team pulled out of the World Cricket League Division Three. The organization was suspended again in 2015 citing "significant concerns about the governance, finance, reputation and cricketing activities" of the organization. However, the U.S. team was still allowed to continue competing in events such as the 2015 ICC World Twenty20 Qualifier, with ICC Americas serving as an interim caretaker of its cricket operations. In 2017, the ICC voted to expel the USACA, citing its increasing debt and failure to ratify a certified constitution.

In January 2019, a new body known as USA Cricket was approved as a new associate member of the ICC, replacing the USACA as the United States' representative.

== National teams ==
=== Men's team ===
In 2018, the U.S. men's team was promoted to Division Two of the World Cricket League for the first time. In 2019, the United States qualified for the inaugural season of its replacement, the ICC Cricket World Cup League 2, whose top teams will move on to the qualifier for the 2023 Cricket World Cup. On November 16, 2021, the ICC announced that the United States and West Indies would co-host the 2024 Men's T20 World Cup. It will be the first ICC World Cup tournament to feature matches played in the United States - with three venues finalized in New York, Florida & Texas.

In December 2021, the United States hosted Ireland in a T20I and ODI series, which marked the country's first-ever home series against a Test-playing nation. The two teams split the T20 series. However, the ODI series was cancelled due to COVID-19 issues.

=== Women's team ===
In November 2021, the United States won the 2021 Women's T20 World Cup Americas Qualifier, advancing to the global qualifier for the 2023 Women's T20 World Cup.

== Domestic competitions ==
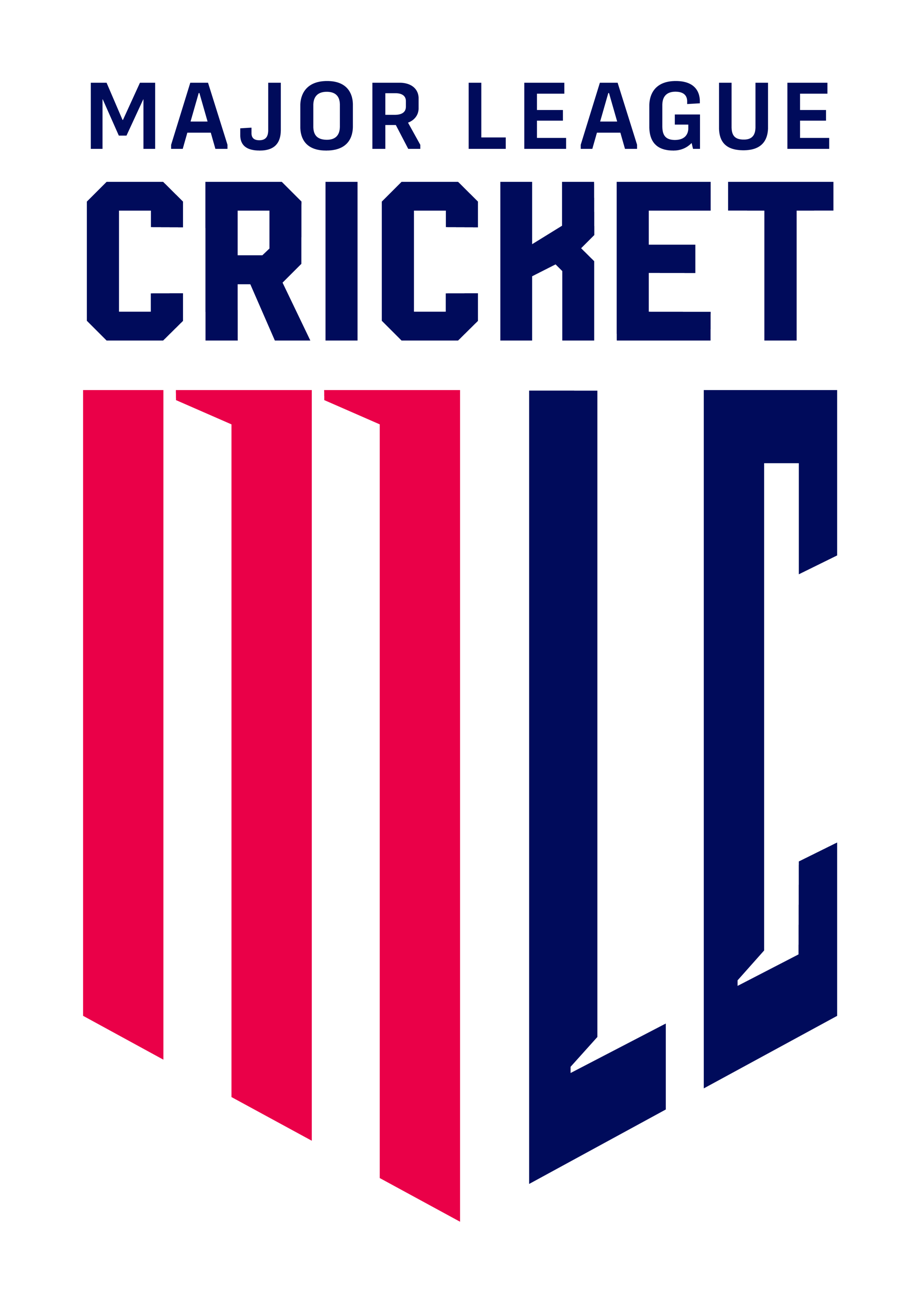

There have been various attempts at domestic cricket leagues in the United States: Pro Cricket was formed in 2004 as a commercial cricket league not sanctioned by the ICC. It played a modified T20 format with changes intended to further increase the pace of the game including five-ball overs. The USACA later in partnership with New Zealand Cricket proposed a T20 competition known as the American Premier League patterned after competitions such as the Indian Premier League. It was announced in 2009 but never came to fruition. The American Twenty20 Championship was later held in 2011 as a three-day event in New Jersey between regional teams to help develop and promote American players.

Via the investment arm American Cricket Enterprises (ACE), USA Cricket has sanctioned the domestic T20 league Minor League Cricket. It plans to launch the professional competition Major League Cricket in 2023.

== International competitions ==
On November 16, 2021, the International Cricket Council announced that the United States along with the West Indies would co-host the 2024 ICC Men's T20 World Cup, making the first ICC World Cup Tournament to take place in the United States. Team USA upset Team Pakistan in the 2024 Cricket World Cup.

== Cricket grounds ==
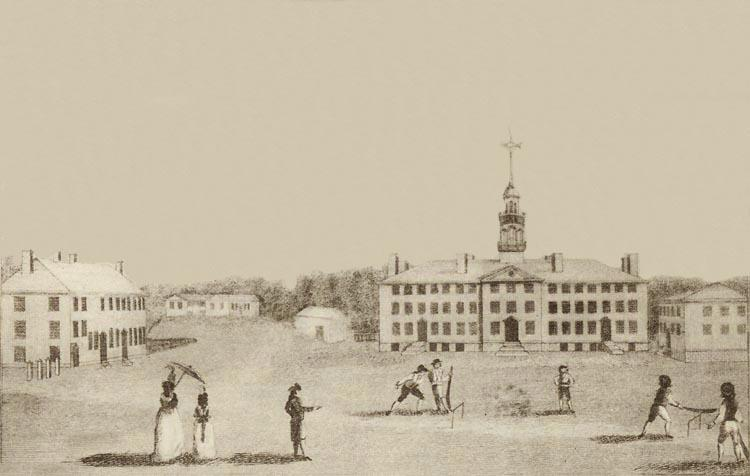
Students playing cricket at Dartmouth College in 1793

There are only a few purpose-built cricket grounds in the United States. They include the Germantown Cricket Club Ground and the Philadelphia Cricket Club Ground in Philadelphia, Pennsylvania; the Randolph St. George Walker Park on Staten Island, New York; the Central Broward Regional Park in Lauderhill, Florida; and the Leo Magnus Cricket Complex in Van Nuys, California.

The Indianapolis World Sports Park in Indianapolis, Indiana, which features cricket grounds, was completed in 2014, and hosted the USACA's national championship that year.

The game is also played at a number of shared purpose venues, including Van Cortlandt Stadium in Bronx, New York.

In 2021, American Cricket Enterprises leased AirHogs Stadium, the home field of the defunct Texas AirHogs baseball team, to redevelop it as a cricket-specific stadium and USA Cricket training facility. The revamped stadium was completed in 2023 and it was named Grand Prairie Stadium.

The main cricket grounds in the United States are as follows:

- Central Broward Regional Park in Lauderhill – This location has hosted 4 T20I since 2010. It is the home ground for the Ft. Lauderdale Lions in Minor League Cricket. It is also scheduled to host a few matches during the 2024 ICC Men's T20 World Cup.
- Grand Prairie Stadium in Grand Prairie – This stadium is used for the Major League Cricket matches, it is also home ground for the Texas Super Kings. It is scheduled to host a few matches during the 2024 ICC Men's T20 World Cup.
- Prairie View Cricket Complex in Prairie View - Located just outside Houston, this is the largest cricket ground complex in the United States, comprising 14 separate grounds. It hosted international cricket series of USA vs Canada and USA vs Bangladesh in April 2024.
- Leo Magnus Cricket Complex in Los Angeles – This hosted five List-A matches between India-A and Australia-A in 1999. It is the home ground for the Hollywood Master Blasters and the Los Angeles Lashings.
- Indianapolis World Sports Park in Indianapolis – The facility is slated to open in 2014 and hosted the domestic season in 2014 and 2015
- Church Street Park in Morrisville - This is home to the Morrisville Cardinals and hosted the 2021 Minor League Cricket season finals and under renovation by USA Cricket.
- Germantown Cricket Club Ground – This hosted a few first-class matches.
- Philadelphia Cricket Club Ground – This hosted a few first-class matches.
- Randolph St. George Walker Park

== See also ==
- United States men's national cricket team
- United States women's national cricket team
- List of United States of America ODI cricketers
- List of United States national cricket captains
- NYPD Cricket League
- Comparison between cricket and baseball
- Compton Cricket Club
- History of United States cricket
- Cricket All-Stars, a 2015 T20 exhibition series played in America
- Indian cricket team in the West Indies and the United States in 2019
- Major League Cricket
- Minor League Cricket
