= James Atkins (rugby union) =

James Ramsey Atkins
Rugby union career
- Position: Scrum-half
International career
Years	Team	Apps	(Points)
–	Belgium		

James Ramsey Atkins is an English-born former rugby union player and professional cricketer. He played as a scrum-half and represented the Belgium men’s national rugby union team in the mid-2000s, earning several international caps. At club level, he played rugby for the Brussels Barbarians. Following his rugby career, he played professional cricket, captaining an English representative side in the inaugural American Premiere League tournament.

== Rugby career ==
Atkins was selected for the Belgium men’s national rugby union team during the mid-2000s, with his position listed as scrum-half and his club affiliation recorded as the Brussels Barbarians in national team selection lists.

He was named in Belgium’s matchday squad during the Rugby World Cup 2007 qualifying campaign and made on-field appearances as a substitute in international fixtures in 2004 and 2005, including Belgium’s qualifying match against Latvia in October 2004 and a representative fixture against the British Army in January 2005.

At club level, Atkins played for the Brussels Barbarians, one of Belgium’s leading rugby union clubs. Belgian rugby coverage records him scoring points for the club in domestic competition during the same period.

== Cricket career ==
Alongside rugby, Atkins played competitive cricket in England. While attending Durham University, he was part of an era in which the university’s elite cricket programme, the Durham University Centre of Cricketing Excellence, provided high-performance training and competition for student-athletes. The Durham centre was established in 1996, prior to the national rollout of the ECB’s UCCE system, and produced multiple international cricketers during that period.

In 2021, Atkins played professional cricket in the inaugural American Premiere League (APL) tournament, held at Yogi Berra Stadium in Little Falls, New Jersey. He captained the league’s “Premium English” representative side during the competition.

== Other activities ==
Following his playing career, Atkins has been involved in rugby development in the United States. He has served as a director on the board of Play Rugby USA, a nonprofit organisation promoting youth rugby participation.

== Personal life ==
Atkins is the son of Sir Robert Atkins, a British politician who served as a Member of Parliament, government minister and Member of the European Parliament. He is the brother of Victoria Atkins, a British politician and Member of Parliament, as recorded in her entry in the House of Commons Register of Members’ Financial Interests. He married Kellie Calnan in 2006.
