= United States of America Cricket Association =

Sports association

- Sport: Cricket
- Jurisdiction: United States
- Abbreviation: USACA
- Founded: 1961
- Affiliation: Founder Associate Member (1965 - 2017) of the then International Cricket Conference now International Cricket Council
- Headquarters: Miami Beach, Florida, U.S.
- President: Gladstone Dainty
- Secretary: Sankar Renganathan

Official website
- www.usaca.org/%20(now%20defunct)
- (United States)

The United States of America Cricket Association (USACA), headquartered in Miami Beach, was the national governing body for all cricket in the United States, until it was replaced by USA Cricket in 2019. The board was formed in 1961.

USACA was an Associate Member of the International Cricket Council until June 23, 2017, when it was expelled following an ICC Board recommendation in April and a Dispute Resolution Committee hearing before the Honourable Michael Beloff QC.

== History ==
The United States of America Cricket Association was started in 1961 with the help of John Marder and was admitted to the International Cricket Conference as an associate member in 1965. This was the same group that had been so integral in keeping the United States out of international cricket when formed in 1909. The administration of the USACA proved unable to administer the sport in the United States effectively. This led to suspensions from tournaments and ineligibilities and rendered the USACA largely inactive.

The United States was able to participate in the ICC Trophy when the tournament started in 1979. The United States' team saw success in this tournament and continued to improve through 2005.

In July 2009, the USACA announced it was inviting proposals from prospective sponsors, broadcasters and game development partners to help launch the American Premier League, an Indian Premier League style Twenty20 league tournament. No American Premier League matches were played in 2010, and in April 2011 no further matches have been announced. The board announced in December 2010 that it had signed a $10 million deal with New Zealand Cricket, together with several strategic investors as stakeholders, creating a new body called Cricket Holdings America to manage all commercial rights for cricket in USA, including Twenty20 rights, in perpetuity.

In January 2011, USACA was awarded the top prize in the Junior Participation Initiative category by the ICC America's region in the 2010 Pepsi ICC Development Programme Awards for the United States Youth Cricket Association's Schools Program.

The USACA supported the American Twenty20 Championship, an American Twenty20 cricket tournament aimed at grooming American cricket players for international events and to spread interest in American Cricket. Its first season was only a 3-day affair, played in New Jersey and won by the Atlantic Division. The tournament was supported by the United States of America Cricket Association, the national federation of cricket in the US. After not being held in 2012 and 2013, the USACA announced that the tournament would be again played in 2014.

However, in May 2014, the city of Indianapolis, Indiana terminated its agreement to host the relaunch of the USA Cricket Association National Championships, which were due to be held from August in the brand new $6 million Indianapolis World Sports Park facility. Indianapolis Parks and Recreation director John W. Williams sent a letter to USACA notifying them of the termination and a city official confirmed that the decision includes not just the 2014 championship but the entire three-year agreement which had been signed in September 2013 under former USACA chief executive Darren Beazley. In June 2014, USA Cricket Association announced that that year's USACA National Championship would be moved to Lauderhill, Florida following the termination of the three-year hosting agreement by the city of Indianapolis.

== Membership ==
The USACA had 51 state association members across seven zones (Atlantic, New York, South East, North East, Central West, Central East, West Coast) in the United States.

USACA Regions
Eastern Conference	States, territories, districts	Leagues
Atlantic	Delaware, New Jersey, Washington DC, Pennsylvania, West Virginia, Virginia, Maryland	Cricket League of New Jersey, Garden State Cricket League, Millennium Cricket League, New Jersey Cricket Association, New Jersey State Cricket & Umpire's Association, Washington Cricket League, Washington Metropolitan Cricket League
New York	New York	American Cricket League, Bangladeshi Cricket League, Brooklyn Cricket League, Commonwealth Cricket League, Eastern American Cricket Association, Metropolitan Cricket League, Nassau New York Cricket Association, New York Cricket League, New York Metropolitan and District Association League, NYPD Cricket League
South East	Florida, Georgia, North Carolina, South Carolina, Puerto Rico	Florida Cricket Conference, South Florida Cricket Association, Florida South East Cricket Association, Atlanta Georgia Cricket Conference
North East	Connecticut, Maine, Massachusetts, New Hampshire, Rhode Island, Vermont	Massachusetts State Cricket League, Connecticut Cricket League, Southern Connecticut Cricket Association
Western Conference	States, territories, districts	Leagues
Central West	Nebraska, North Dakota, Oklahoma, Colorado, South Dakota, Texas, Wyoming, New Mexico, Louisiana, Mississippi, Arkansas	Colorado Cricket League, Heartland Cricket League or Cricket League of Iowa and Nebraska, Central Texas Cricket League, Houston Cricket League, North Texas Cricket Association, Midwest Cricket League of Kansas.
Central East	Illinois, Indiana, Iowa, Michigan, Minnesota, Missouri, Kansas, Ohio, Wisconsin, Kentucky, Tennessee, Alabama	American Cricket Conference, Great Lakes Cricket Conference, International Cricket Management League, Michigan Cricket Association (Associate), Midwest Cricket Conference, Minnesota Cricket Association, National Cricket League, United Cricket Conference
West Coast	Alaska, Oregon, Washington, Idaho, California, Arizona, Hawaii, Nevada, Utah	Bay Area Cricket Alliance, California Cricket Academy, California Cricket League, Greater Los Angeles Cricket Association (Associate), Northern California Cricket Association, North West Cricket League, Sacramento Cricket Association, Southern California Cricket Association, Arizona Cricket Association (Associate), Orange County Cricket Association (Associate), San Diego Cricket Association (Associate)

== President of the USACA ==
#	Name	Took office	Left office
1	John Marder	c. 1961	unknown
	Unknown		
?	Nasir Khan	?	?
	Unknown		
?	Masood Syed	1996	1999
?	Ricky Craig	1999	2000
?	Kamran Rasheed Khan	2000	2001
?	Atul Rai	2001	2003
?	Gladstone Dainty	2003	present

== Executive Secretary of the USACA ==
#	Name	Took office	Left office
1			
	Paul D Salva		
	John Aaron		
	Kenwyn S Williams		
	Mascelles Bailey		
	Sankar Renganathan	2015	Present

== Domestic cricket ==
The USACA organized the following tournaments:

- American Premier League (planned in 2009 and again in 2010 but never took place)
- American Twenty20 Championship (took place once, in 2011, with 8 teams participating in a tournament over 3 days, was planned but didn't occur in 2012 and 2013, before having their license cancelled in 2014)

== Controversies and expulsion by ICC ==
The 2005 ICC Trophy represented a chance for the US to re-establish themselves on the world stage and qualify for the 2007 World Cup. A poor showing saw them finish at the bottom of their group, with four losses and a match abandoned due to rain from their five group fixtures. This failure robbed the USA of the prize of full One Day International status on offer to the World Cup qualifiers. This failure was compounded on 9 August 2005 when the ICC expelled the US from the 2005 ICC Intercontinental Cup.

The United States of America Cricket Association was again suspended from the ICC and the team was pulled from the World Cricket League. The suspension was due to an internal dispute over a constitution for the USACA. The dispute was resolved in early 2008, and the suspension was lifted on 1 April of that year.

On 28 January 2015, the ICC sent a letter to USACA outlining several infractions and asking for a re-payment of a 200K loan it made to USACA. The letter was a notice of suspension to be realized at the ICC meeting held in April 2015. At the end of the ICC meeting "It was decided that there was a significant amount of further work that needed to be carried out in order to complete a full and proper assessment. In support of this, a Task Force headed by the ICC Chief Executive David Richardson will travel to the USA to meet relevant stakeholders in USA cricket in order to prepare a comprehensive report for further consideration by the ICC Executive Committee and ICC Board at its next meeting."

Since September 2014 the ICC has frozen USACA's funding, the USACA did not have the money to attend the 2015 Pepsi ICC World T20 Qualifier Tournament in May 2015. Ironically, the tournament was being held in Indiana USA.

In June 2017, the ICC voted to expel the USACA when it failed to adopt a constitution that met a number of requirements to improve governance and transparency.

== Stadiums ==
The only ICC-certified cricket stadium in North America is Central Broward Regional Park in Lauderhill, Florida. The Leo Magnus Cricket Complex in Los Angeles is an established cricket ground with four fields. The city of Indianapolis, Indiana built what it called a "world-class" cricket field as part of the $6 million Indianapolis World Sports Park. The facility opened in 2014.

== Leading cricket grounds in the United States ==
- Central Broward Regional Park in Lauderhill, Florida has hosted four T20I matches since 2010. It is the only ICC-certified cricket stadium in the United States.
- The Leo Magnus Cricket Complex in Los Angeles hosted five List-A matches between India-A and Australia-A in 2000.
- The Indianapolis World Sports Park in Indianapolis opened in 2014.

== See also ==
- Cricket in the United States
- United States Youth Cricket Association
- Major League Cricket
- United States national cricket team
- American Premier League
