= St. Maria Goretti High School =

St. Maria Goretti Catholic High School

Location
- 18614 Crestwood Drive; Hagerstown, (Washington County), Maryland 21742; United States; 39°39′50″N 77°42′11″W

Information
- Type: Private, Coeducational
- Motto: Pro Deo et Patria (For God and Country)
- Religious affiliation: Christian
- Denomination: Catholic
- Patron saint: Maria Goretti
- Established: 1933
- Status: Closed
- Closed: June 2024
- Superintendent: Dr. Barbara McGraw Edmondson
- President: Christopher Cosentino
- Principal: Dr. Amy Summers
- Chaplain: Rev. Collin Poston
- Grades: 9–12
- Enrollment: 147
- Average class size: 12
- Colors: Blue and Gold
- Mascot: Gael
- Team name: Gaels
- Accreditation: Middle States Association of Colleges and Schools
- Newspaper: Gael Beat
- Tuition: 10,000-Catholic 12,000- Non practicing Catholic / Other
- Feeder schools: St. Mary Catholic School, St. Joseph Parish School, Mother Seton School, Corpus Christi, The Visitation Academy, The Banner School, and more.
- Dean of Students: Matt Miller
- Athletic Director: Sidney McCray
- Website: http://www.goretti.org

Saint Maria Goretti Catholic High School is a private, Roman Catholic day school located in Hagerstown, Maryland. It is located in the Roman Catholic Archdiocese of Baltimore, within the tri-state areas of the Eastern Panhandle of West Virginia, Western Maryland, and Southern Pennsylvania.

== History ==
The school was originally the upper school for St. Mary's Catholic School, currently a K-8 day school located in downtown Hagerstown. From 1933 to 1955 the school was known as St. Mary's High School. In 1957, the upper school was relocated to a new campus in Hagerstown's North End and was renamed St. Maria Goretti High School in honor of the Italian saint Maria Goretti, who "lost her life at the age of 11 in order to protect her purity". The campus sits adjacent to St. Ann Roman Catholic Church.

For much of the school's history, its faculty and administration was composed partly of members of the School Sisters of Notre Dame. However, in the 1980s and 1990s the high school grew increasingly reliant on lay faculty. Currently, the faculty and administration are entirely from the laity, though the school continues to have a chaplain.

In September 2023, it was announced that the school could shut down in the absence of funding from the Archdiocese of Baltimore which is filing for bankruptcy. The Archdiocese of Baltimore had provided the school with 8.5 million dollars in the decade prior to 2023. Over the same time period, enrollment had declined 33% from its peak of 219 during the 2017-2018 school year. Enrollment for the 2023-2024 school year sat at 147. The school created an independent committee to explore the schools options. The schools lease at its Crestwood Academic Campus expires July 31, 2024. The former campus cannot be used due to being on a floodplain.

In late November 2023, it was announced that the independent exploratory committee created to look into future options had failed to come up with any solutions. Due to this, it was announced that the school would cease operations following at the end 2023-2024 school year

== Athletics ==
St. Maria Goretti is a member of the Baltimore Catholic League in basketball, and a member of the Crossroad Lacrosse League and Metro Independent Lacrosse League in lacrosse. In men's soccer, the school won championships in 2003, 2005, 2008, and 2010. The school also competes in swimming.

== Notable alumni ==
- John P. Donoghue, member of Maryland House of Delegates
- Rodney Monroe, former ACC Player of the Year, basketball, NC State University
- Kelly Wright, former Fox News anchor and national recording artist

== See also ==
- National Catholic Educational Association
