= United States Youth Cricket Association =

- USYCA Logo
- Formation: 2010
- Headquarters: Glen Burnie, Maryland, USA
- Members: United States of America Cricket Association
- President: Jamie Harrison
- Website: usyca.org

The United States Youth Cricket Association (USYCA) is the largest organization in the United States devoted to the promotion of the game of cricket among young people and is an Associate Member of United States of America Cricket Association. USYCA promotes cricket in America by donating cricket sets and instruction to schools, at no cost to the schools, through its Schools Program. USYCA has 60 member organizations: 21 Affiliates, which are organizations that are primarily engaged in youth cricket activities, and 39 Associates, which are organizations that support the USYCA mission, but are primarily engaged in other activities. USYCA is a program partner with the President's Council on Physical Fitness and Sports, and is a tax-exempt organization under section 501(c)(3) of the Internal Revenue Code.

== History ==
USYCA was founded in April 2010 by Jamie Harrison, Edward Fox and Rakesh Kallem.

After receiving an invitation from Physical Education instructor Charles Silberman, Highland Park Elementary School in Prince George's County, Maryland became the first school to receive a cricket set from USYCA in May 2010. In June and July, summer camps were the beneficiaries of USYCA donations, as schools were no longer in session. By the end of the summer, however, the Prince George's County school system had extended a welcome to USYCA, as had schools in Baltimore City. In the Fall of 2010, other jurisdictions in Maryland signed on, such as Kent and Queen Anne's counties on Maryland's Eastern Shore.

USYCA President Jamie Harrison instructs PE teachers in Howard County, Maryland in March 2011

On 24 June it was announced that the C.C. Morris Cricket Library Association had agreed to fund the organization's infrastructure expenses, such as liability insurance and fees associated with the securing of federal tax-exempt status, up to a maximum of $5000. On 13 July, DreamCricket Pavilion Shop pledged 100 free cricket sets, ensuring USYCA of a useful supply of high-quality children's sets with which to approach school systems. This allowed the organization to break free of the time-consuming process of placing sets in one school at a time.

Another key development that summer was the introduction to USYCA of Maria Grossi, and DTY Pty Ltd., an Australian firm that was the supplier of cricket sets and apparel to Cricket Australia's MILO In2Cricket program. The referral came by way of Rebecca Mulgrew of CA, who first came into contact with Harrison in 2009 while he was coaching the cricket team at Cardinal Gibbons School in Baltimore. By August, DTY was in discussions with USYCA that would result in the donation of 500 custom-made cricket sets, designed especially for the USYCA Schools Program. These sets would eventually be named the American Cricket Champ, and was the first set ever produced specifically for the American market.

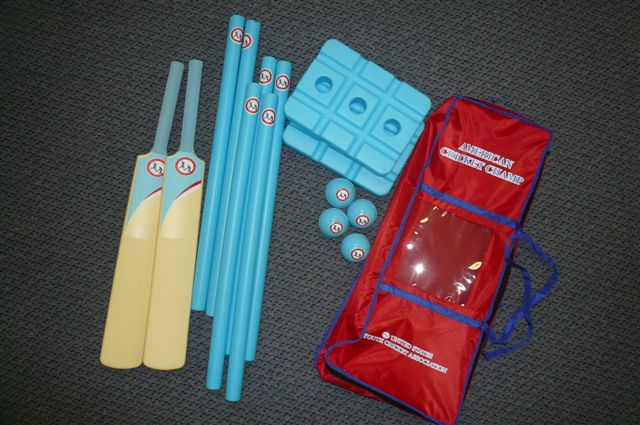
American Cricket Champ set

Also that summer, USYCA produced its constitution, which was largely based upon the USACA document, and in August the organization elected its first office holders.

Shortly thereafter, Michael Thomas of Maryland, a member of the British Officers Cricket Club and the C.C. Morris group, was appointed as USYCA's first treasurer.

During these early months, individuals were volunteering to lead state youth cricket organizations for USYCA, so that by the end of August, USYCA was represented in 16 US states.

In September, the first three USYCA standing committees were established: membership, finance and constitution/by-laws.

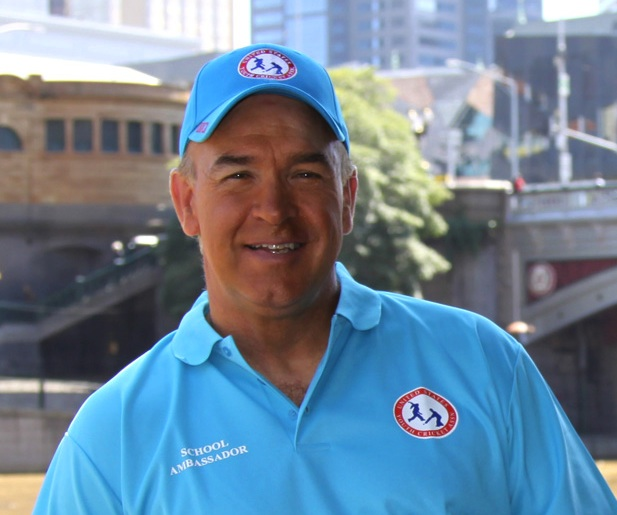
Mike Young

In the Fall of 2010, USYCA began placing cricket sets in schools in Maryland, and international cricket celebrities, such as Australia's Nathan Bracken and Damien Martyn, posed for photos wearing USYCA tee shirts. Bracken included his son, Chase (also in a USYCA shirt), in his portrait. Also that fall, a USYCA instructional video was produced by Rohit Kulkarni and City Lights Films, and was added to the USYCA YouTube page. This three-part video, "Introducing Cricket To Children in the United States," was viewed thousands of times in its first year online, and became key in delivering the USYCA formula to those spreading cricket to new demographics.

In November, USYCA was granted Associate Member status by USACA, and made itself eligible for recognition and support from the International Cricket Council. This eligibility soon paid off handsomely, as the USYCA Schools Program was awarded the top prize in the Junior Participation Initiative category by the ICC America's region in the 2010 Pepsi ICC Development Programme Awards.

This award in January 2011 came only days after Mike Young, the American fielding coach for the Australian national cricket team, had come out in public support for USYCA, modeling the organization's apparel at a photo shoot on the banks of the Yarra River in Melbourne, only hours before the Aussies were to take on the English in a One Day International match.

In February, American Cricket Champ sets began to arrive at USYCA headquarters in Maryland, and were quickly redistributed to schools across the country.

On 14 April 2011, USYCA held its first-ever Annual General Meeting.

In June, USYCA donated cricket sets to sixteen Alabama schools that had suffered severe tornado damage two months prior. In July, USYCA announced that 136 elementary and middle schools in the Charlotte-Mecklenburg Schools system in North Carolina were adding cricket to their PE curriculums, and the schools would also be offering students opportunities to play the game in other venues.

In December, the USYCA purchased the USYCA Foxfire Field, one of the country's best cricket grounds, for $1 per year and will be the venue for countless youth cricket tournaments and development of youth cricket in the United States. The field is located centrally 20 miles south of Wichita, Kansas, and it had been the vision of USYCA vice-president Edward Fox, who personally funded the construction at a total cost of $120,000.

USYCA announced the opening of its first national headquarters, and a dedicated phone line, in January 2012. The headquarters building is located in Glen Burnie, Maryland, near Baltimore-Washington International Airport.

In July 2013, the first state championship was held in Maryland. The match was played between Germantown and Cockeysville, Germantown being the victor. The third place match was played between Bowie and Timonium, Bowie being the victor. Maryland Deputy Secretary of State, Rajan Natarajan, attended the matches, and presented awards following it.

In April 2016, USYCA has its third election and Ranjeet Singh from St. Louis, Missouri was elected as the President. In March 2017, a new chapter opened in history of USYCA, when NYCL, the largest youth cricket event in USA became part of USYCA. NYCL in 2017 featured 45 Teams and was held in Connecticut and New Jersey, hosted by New England Youth Cricket Academy, DreamCricket and CricMax.

== Association With Reebok ==
In March 2012, USYCA announced a three-year sponsorship deal with Reebok Cricket, the first of its kind for an international sports brand in the United States cricket market.

== Partnership With American Cricket Federation ==
On 6 May 2013, USYCA announced its partnership with the American Cricket Federation. The agreement gives USYCA the lead role in cricket development in age groups up to 13-Under, while ACF will coordinate the transition to older age groups. The partnership anticipated a substantial sharing of resources, communications, facilities and volunteer networks.

== National Youth Cricket Day ==
USYCA established 24 March as National Youth Cricket Day. This day was selected because it was on that day in 2010 that Venu Palaparthi wrote to Harrison on behalf of DreamCricket.com, making the initial offer of ten donated cricket sets.

== Logo ==
The USYCA logo, unveiled on 5 May 2010, was designed by Jamie Harrison and produced by his 17-year-old son, Zachary. It reflects the mission of USYCA through its depiction of a young girl bowling and a young boy batting; its color scheme of red, white and blue marks it as clearly American.

== See also ==
- Cricket in the United States
- History of United States cricket
- Major League Cricket
  - MLC Jr. Championship
- NYPD Cricket League
- United States national cricket team
