= Cardinal Gibbons School (Baltimore) =

Location
- 3225 Wilkens Avenue; Baltimore, Maryland 21229; United States; 39°16′26″N 76°40′14″W

Information
- Type: Private
- Motto: Latin: Emitte Spiritum Tuum ("Send forth Your Spirit")
- Denomination: Roman Catholic
- Established: 1962
- Closed: 2010
- Sister school: Seton Keough High School
- Oversight: Archdiocese of Baltimore
- President: Bro. Kevin Strong, F.S.C.
- Principal: David Brown
- Chaplain: Fr. Gerry Kasule
- Grades: 6-12
- Gender: All-male
- Campus size: 33 acres
- Campus type: Urban
- Colors: Red and White
- Song: Alma Mater
- Athletics conference: MIAA, BCL
- Sports: 9 Varsity teams
- Nickname: CG
- Team name: Crusaders
- Rival: Mount Saint Joseph High School
- Accreditation: Middle States Association of Colleges and Schools
- Newspaper: The Cardinal
- Yearbook: The Crusader
- Affiliation: Lasallian Network

The Cardinal Gibbons School, also referred to as CG and most commonly as Gibbons, was a Roman Catholic high school and middle school for boys in Baltimore, Maryland. A private institution for grades 6–12, Gibbons drew its enrollment from the neighborhoods of southwest Baltimore City and the counties surrounding the Baltimore metropolitan area, with some as far away as Harford County, Carroll County, and Frederick County.

Named in honor of James Cardinal Gibbons, said to be Baltimore's most distinguished Catholic churchman, the school was established in 1962 by the Archdiocese of Baltimore. Gibbons occupied the former site of the St. Mary's Industrial School, a reform school for boys and the Alma Mater of baseball great George Herman "Babe" Ruth. Following extensive renovations of the old St. Mary's campus in the early 1960s, the Cardinal Gibbons School opened. The school grew to its peak enrollment of just over 1,000 students in the mid-1970s. In 1988, the school expanded its academic programs with the addition of a middle school. The school closed after the end of the 2009–2010 school year due to declining enrollment and financial problems in the Archdiocese. Organizations were established to make attempts to reopen the school, but the school did not reopen. The grounds are not used for academics, although local schools and sport programs have made use of the athletic facilities. In 2012, neighboring St. Agnes Hospital purchased the old Gibbons property with plans to incorporate the old campus into its growing medical facilities, named the Gibbons Commons.

Gibbons was a college preparatory middle and high school, with core curriculum courses in literature, religious studies, mathematics, laboratory science, social sciences and history, fine arts, physical education, technology, and foreign language. Gibbons offered a variety of Advanced Placement courses, including joint courses with neighboring all-girls high school Seton Keough to the south. Gibbons also offered dual enrollment courses in conjunction with the Community College of Baltimore County. All students at Gibbons were held to academic integrity through the use of an honor code.

There was a long-standing rivalry between Cardinal Gibbons and nearby high school Mount Saint Joseph in the Irvington neighborhood of southwest Baltimore. Due to their close proximity and frequent meetings in playoffs and tournaments in basketball, the rivalry intensified as the Gibbons' basketball program established itself as a championship program in the 1970s. The rivalry grew to include other sports and academics as well.

== History ==
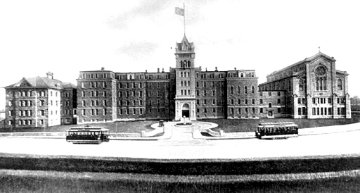
View of St. Mary's Industrial School for Boys from Wilkens Avenue, constructed 1866–1868, c. early 1900s, before the Fire of 1919, St. Mary's Chapel shown at far right

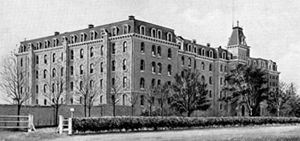
View of St. Mary's Industrial School after the fire of 1919, c. 1930's, (rebuilding funds raised by Babe Ruth)

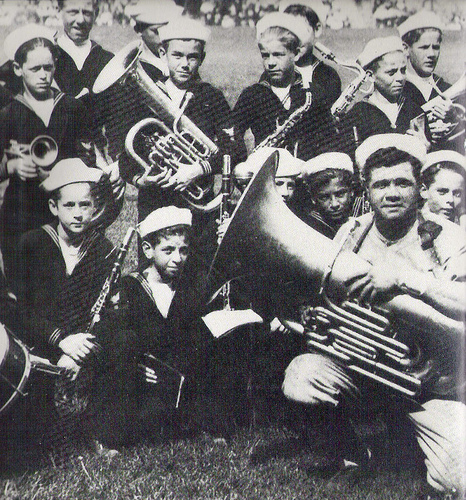
Babe Ruth with members of the St. Mary's Industrial School Band

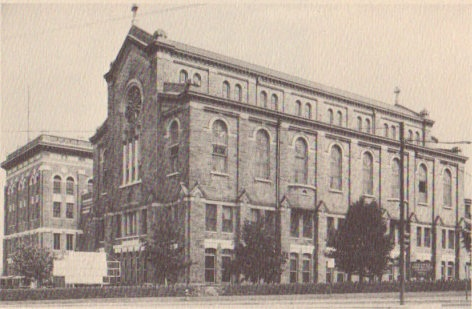
View of St. Mary's Chapel before its renovation, c. 1951

=== Saint Mary's Industrial School for Boys (1866–1950) ===
Saint Mary's Industrial School for Boys was opened in Baltimore City in 1866 by the Archdiocese of Baltimore. The school served as both an orphanage and boarding school for boys, teaching them life and labor skills. At the time, Archbishop Martin Spalding pointed out the need for such a school, and enlisted the aid of the Xaverian Brothers to assist in running the school for the Archdiocese. As attendance at the school grew, the large original granite Victorian building was constructed and in use by 1868.

In 1874, the school continued to grow and enroll more young boys. The curriculum included academic classes, religious education, sports periods, and work in industrial areas. Courses included basket-making, bottle-covering, baking, gardening, tailoring, and farming.

In 1902, a young boy named George Herman Ruth, later known as "the Babe," was enrolled at St. Mary's by his parents. He learnt the game of baseball at St. Mary's under the tutelage of Brother Matthias and became one of St. Mary's most notable alumni. In 1919, a fire destroyed much of the old Victorian-styled campus. Alumnus Babe Ruth, who at the time was playing for the New York Yankees, asked to take the St. Mary's School band along on "road trips" to several major league ballparks around the Northeast, in an attempt to raise money to replace the main school building.

The numbers of pupils and orphans requiring the services of the industrial school declined; it finally ceased operations in 1950. Although much of the original St. Mary's campus was demolished, one building remained from the original construction during the 1866-1868 period and another from the reconstruction after the 1919 fire. Both buildings were utilized by the Cardinal Gibbons School. The athletic field that Babe learned to play baseball on was utilized by the Cardinal Gibbons baseball teams from 1962 until closing, and affectionately called "Babe Ruth Field".

=== Cardinal Gibbons High School (1962–1988) ===
Cardinal Gibbons High School opened in September 1962. On the corner of Wilkens and Caton Avenues, where the large old Victorian-styled stone walls of the old Industrial School once stood, another Catholic institution was founded and constructed to succeed St. Mary's Industrial School.

In 1959 Archbishop Francis Keough chose the ground of the vacant St. Mary's buildings for a new diocesan high school campus, with ample room for athletic fields and religious community housing. A considerable construction and renovation project ensued, utilizing buildings from the original and rebuilt St. Mary's campuses, along with new buildings for the school. Archbishop Keough contacted the Marianists, who had previously taught at several local grammar schools in the diocese; they agreed to return to Baltimore and take charge of the new high school. Brother Matthew Betz, S.M., was appointed the first principal of the new school.

In September 1962, the school was operating with a working faculty of nine, including a secretary, janitor, and 150 freshmen. On September 8, 1963, Archbishop Lawrence Cardinal Shehan presided over the sealing of the main building's cornerstone and the dedication of the new school to former ninth Archbishop of Baltimore James Cardinal Gibbons.

Over the years, the Cardinal Gibbons High School continued to grow. By the 1968–1969 school year, the Crusaders made sports headlines with the championship play of both the varsity basketball and baseball teams. Long-time coach O. Ray Mullis established a Maryland Scholastic Association and later a Baltimore Catholic League basketball dynasty at Gibbons over the next decade. It was during this time that frequent meetings on the basketball court sparked a fierce rivalry with another local Catholic high school, Mount Saint Joseph. Gibbons made a name for itself as a powerhouse for academics and athletics in the southwest Baltimore region.

=== The Cardinal Gibbons School (1988–2010) ===
In 1988, the Cardinal Gibbons School added a Middle School Program, enrolling students in grades 6 through 8. Formerly known as Cardinal Gibbons High School, the school adopted its final name, the Cardinal Gibbons School. In 2001, Gibbons switched to the President-Principal model, naming Brother Kevin Strong, F.S.C., the first President of the school. The school joined the LaSallian Network of Schools that year.

The middle school program continued successfully until the end of the 2009 school year, graduating its last eighth grade class the following year. Due to decreased enrollment and financial strains on both the Archdiocese of Baltimore and the surrounding communities, Gibbons headed toward closing its doors.

On March 3, 2010, the Archdiocese of Baltimore announced it would close Gibbons at the end of the 2009–2010 school year, as part of a broader consolidation of twelve other Baltimore parochial schools in the face of declining enrollment and reports of Archdiocesan financial losses. Members of the Cardinal Gibbons board, alumni, students, and staff expressed distress at the decision and, in April, explored possible ways to buy the property and continue the school independently, but were ultimately unsuccessful. Linda Ruth Tosetti, Babe Ruth's granddaughter, lamented the possible loss of another of the places important in her grandfather's history, on the heels of the recent razing and replacement of the old Yankee Stadium in 2009, affectionately known as the "House that Ruth Built". In response to the closing, alumni and supporters of Gibbons formed Gibbons Educational Services (G.E.S.), a non-profit organization devoted to fostering the memory of the school.

=== Gibbons Commons ===
In March 2012, it was announced that next door St. Agnes Hospital reached an agreement with the Archdiocese to purchase the property. Plans for the property include subsidized apartments, office space, retail and restaurant space, and a YMCA location. In 2016, the Cal Ripken Sr. Foundation finished renovations and reopened "Babe Ruth Field," given its significance to Baltimore and American baseball history. In 2017 the property was still under development and construction.

== Campus ==
=== Babe Ruth Field ===
Babe Ruth Field was home to the Cardinal Gibbons baseball team. Located on the site of the same grounds that young George Herman Ruth learned to play the game on, the field has been home to a storied and successful baseball programs for over a century. Ruth Field was unique in its shape, with center field reaching to 442 feet. After the Cal Ripken Sr. Foundation renovations in 2016, the field was returned to its original configuration from the St. Mary's era.

=== Fine Arts Building ===
As the only building to survive the fire of 1919 on campus, the Fine Arts building was part of the original structure of the old St. Mary's Industrial School, constructed during the opening of St. Mary's. In this building, Babe Ruth spent time working on the various trade and industrial requirements, where he especially excelled at the trade of tailoring in the St. Mary's curriculum. Before closing, this building housed fine arts classrooms for art and music, a student activities center, and the Justin Fisher Memorial weight-room in the bottom level.

=== The Grotto ===
The Grotto was an area on the Cardinal Gibbons campus that held special meaning to alumni and the Gibbons community. In 1968, a plane crashed in the mountains of western Maryland, taking the lives of three students and one teacher, Mike Slovatinek, Mark Mitchell, Paul Deminnis, and Brother Ben Borchers, respectively. All four were part of the Cardinal Gibbons School flying club, and were returning from a trip to Ohio to visit the United States Air Force Museum in Dayton. In the Grotto was a statue of Mary and a plaque adorning the statue with the names of those lost in the crash. In 2012, the statue was relocated from the Grotto to St. Augustine Roman Catholic Church in Elkridge, Maryland.

== Academics ==
The school required 28 credits to graduate, 20 hours of community service per year, and mandatory attendance in the school's campus ministry program, including retreats and service opportunities. The school, in joint partnership with neighboring all-girls Seton Keough High School, shared special, coeducational classes between the two high schools. Gibbons also offered dual enrollment courses with the Community College of Baltimore County.

== Extracurricular activities ==
=== Athletics ===
While many Gibbons teams achieved success and won championships in their respective sports, perhaps the most notable success was that of the basketball program. For over 31 years, Gibbons basketball was led by local coaching legend, O. Ray Mullis. During his tenure as coach, Mullis and the Gibbons basketball program amassed over 600 career victories and 31 league or tournament championships, including a record 6 Baltimore Catholic League championships.

==== Sport championships ====
The school was a member of Maryland Scholastic Association, (1964-1993); Baltimore Catholic League†, (1974-2010, Basketball only); Maryland Interscholastic Athletic Association, (1993-2010).

Varsity Team	Championship Year(s)	Ref.
Basketball	1969, 1970, 1974†, 1979†, 1983, 1985†, 1988, 1989†, 1991†, 1992, 1994†	
Baseball	1969, 1971, 1973, 1981, 1982, 1985, 1999, 2000	
Track & Field	2000, 2002, 2003, 2004, 2006, 2009, 2010	
Tennis	1971, 1977, 1978, 1979, 1980, 1981	
Football	1988, 1993, 2000	
Lacrosse	1972, 2008	
Indoor Track & Field	2003, 2004	
Soccer	1969, 1971	
Cross Country	1967, 1985	
Wrestling	1978, 1979	

==== Cricket ====
In 2009, Cardinal Gibbons formed a Cricket Club, the first of its kind in any high school in the state of Maryland to regularly play and compete in the English national sport. A travel team would go on to play several youth teams in the metropolitan Washington, D.C., area. The director of the Gibbons cricket program, Jamie Harrison, went on to found the United States Youth Cricket Association.

== Notable alumni ==
In the over forty-eight years of Gibbons' existence, its alumni charted many interesting and successful courses:

=== Arts ===
- Al Jolson^{†} (St. Mary's Industrial School alumnus) – singer, film actor, and comedian.

=== Athletes ===
==== Basketball ====
- Norman Black, '75 – professional basketball player, NBA
- Dylon Cormier, '10 – professional basketball player, DBL
- Quintin Dailey^{†}, '79 – professional basketball player, NBA
- Kenny Hasbrouck, '04 – professional basketball player, NBA Development League and various international leagues
- Leon Williams, '04 – professional basketball player, various international leagues
- Steve Wojciechowski, '94 – basketball player and coach at Duke University; men's basketball head coach at Marquette University

==== Football ====
- Roger Brown, '86 – NFL player with the Green Bay Packers and New York Giants
- Jean Fugett, '68 – NFL player with the Dallas Cowboys and Washington Redskins
- Vaughn Hebron, '89 – NFL player with the Philadelphia Eagles and Denver Broncos
- Kiero Small, '07 – NFL player with the Cleveland Browns and Baltimore Ravens

==== Baseball ====
- George Herman "Babe" Ruth^{†}, 1914 (St. Mary's Industrial School Alumnus) – National Hall of Fame baseball player with Baltimore Orioles, Boston Red Sox, New York Yankees, and Boston Braves

=== Military ===
- Mark E. Ferguson III, '74 – Admiral, U.S. Navy (Ret.), commander, U.S. Naval Forces Europe and U.S. Naval Forces Africa and commander, Allied Joint Force Command Naples and 37th Vice Chief of Naval Operations.
- Patrick Finnegan^{†}, '67 – Brigadier general, U.S. Army (Ret.), dean of academics, United States Military Academy, president, Longwood University

=== Public service ===
==== Law Enforcement ====
- Richard Worley, '83 - Commissioner of the Baltimore Police Department

==== Representatives ====
- James E. Malone, Jr., '75 – Delegate, District 12A (D), Maryland House of Delegates
- Brian K. McHale, '72 – Delegate, District 46 (D), Maryland House of Delegates

Notes: † - Deceased

== Past principals ==
Principal	Years
Bro. Matthew Betz, S.M.	1962–1964
Bro. Anthony Ipsaro, S.M.	1964–1966
Bro. William Abel, S.M.	1966–1969
Bro. Frank O'Donnell, S.M.	1969–1976
William Hartman (layman)	1976–1991
Donald DelCiello	1991–1994
James Lamar	1994–1995
Leo Johnson	1995–1996
Philip Forte	1996-1997
Gary Meyerl	1997–2002
Rev. John O'Brien	2002–2003
Philip Forte	2003-2007
David Brown	2007–2010
