= Jean Fugett =

American football player (born 1951)

No. 84
- Position: Tight end

Personal information
- Born: December 16, 1951 (age 74); Baltimore, Maryland, U.S.
- Listed height: 6 ft 3 in (1.91 m)
- Listed weight: 225 lb (102 kg)

Career information
- High school: Cardinal Gibbons (Baltimore)
- College: Amherst (MA)
- NFL draft: 1972: 13th round, 338th overall pick

Career history
- Dallas Cowboys (1972–1975); Washington Redskins (1976–1979)

Awards and highlights
- Little All-American (1971); Pro Bowl (1977)

Career NFL statistics
- Receptions: 156
- Receiving yards: 2,270
- Receiving touchdowns: 28
- Stats at Pro Football Reference

Jean Schloss Fugett Jr. (born December 16, 1951) is an American former professional football player who was a tight end in the National Football League (NFL) for the Dallas Cowboys and Washington Redskins. He played college football at Amherst College. After his NFL career, he became a lawyer and businessman.

== Early life ==
Born and raised in Baltimore, Maryland, he skipped two grades as a youngster. Raised Catholic, he attended Cardinal Gibbons School, where he started playing football as a senior, becoming a two-way player (tight end and defensive end). He graduated in 1968 and was named the Baltimore Catholic Athlete of the Year, the first black athlete to be given the award.

Fugett accepted an academic scholarship to Amherst College in Massachusetts, because he wanted to go to a school where he could play both basketball and football. As a senior in 1971, he led the team in receiving and scoring with 39 receptions for 635 yards and 9 touchdowns, while earning Little All-American honors.

== Professional career ==
=== Dallas Cowboys ===
Fugett was selected by the Dallas Cowboys in the thirteenth round (338th overall) of the 1972 NFL draft. The Cowboys carried only two tight ends on the roster in those years, but saw potential in the 20-year-old rookie and made an exception by adding him as the third one. As a rookie, he was the backup behind future hall of famer Mike Ditka, after passing an injured Billy Truax on the depth chart. He was used mostly on passing downs and finished with 7 receptions for 94 yards.

In 1973, Billy Joe DuPree was taken in the first round of that year's draft and became the starter at tight end. Fugett remained as the backup tight end, collecting 9 receptions for 168 yards and 3 touchdowns, leading the team with an 18.7-yard average per reception.

In 1974, as the backup behind Dupree, he appeared in 12 games with 2 starts. He made 4 receptions for 60 yards and one touchdown.

In 1975, Fugett started nine games in place of an injured DuPree. He was the team's second leading receiver (behind Drew Pearson), with 38 receptions for 488 yards and three touchdowns. He also started Super Bowl X against the Pittsburgh Steelers.

=== Washington Redskins ===
After the courts ruled in favor of the National Football League Players Association, a new form of free agency was briefly instituted in 1976. Fugett signed as a free agent with the Washington Redskins and was looked upon as the replacement of former All-Pro Jerry Smith. He was named the starter over Smith, finishing with 27 receptions (tied for third on the team) for 334 yards (third on the team) and 6 receiving touchdowns (led the team).

In 1977, he led the team with 36 receptions for 631 yards, a 17.5-yard average and 5 touchdowns. At the end of the year, he was tied with the St. Louis Cardinals' J. V. Cain in Pro Bowl votes, but edged him based on the team records. In the offseason, he underwent surgery to repair torn cartilage in his left knee.

In 1978, he appeared in 14 games with 12 starts, making 25 receptions for 367 yards and 7 receiving touchdowns (led the team).

In 1979, he was limited with a knee injury and started 6 games, before being replaced in the starting lineup with rookie Don Warren. He retired prior to the 1980 season, after he did not receive a contract offer from the Redskins.

== NFL career statistics ==
Legend
**Bold**	Career high

=== Regular season ===
Year	Team	Games		Receiving				
Year	Team	GP	GS	Rec	Yds	Avg	Lng	TD
1972	DAL	**14**	0	7	94	13.4	29	0
1973	DAL	12	0	9	168	**18.7**	48	3
1974	DAL	12	2	4	60	15.0	24	1
1975	DAL	**14**	9	**38**	488	12.8	**54**	3
1976	WAS	12	12	27	334	12.4	33	6
1977	WAS	**14**	**14**	36	**631**	17.5	52	5
1978	WAS	**14**	12	25	367	14.7	49	**7**
1979	WAS	11	6	10	128	12.8	30	3
		103	55	156	2,270	14.6	54	28

=== Playoffs ===
Year	Team	Games		Receiving				
Year	Team	GP	GS	Rec	Yds	Avg	Lng	TD
1972	DAL	2	0	0	0	0.0	0	0
1973	DAL	2	0	2	37	**18.5**	**38**	0
1975	DAL	**3**	**3**	**5**	27	5.4	9	0
1976	WAS	1	1	4	**61**	15.3	20	0
		8	4	11	125	11.4	38	0

== Personal life ==
During his time with the Redskins, Fugett earned his J.D. degree at the George Washington University Law School, attending school only at night. After his eighth year as a tight end in the NFL and passing the Maryland state bar exam, he joined his older brother Reginald Lewis in business.

While working with Lewis, Fugett largely contributed to the founding of TLC Group in 1983. From there he served as Director and vice-chair of the McCall Pattern Company Management Committee, as founding partner of a Baltimore law firm, and as a partner with Fanfone in Europe. After the death of his brother in 1993, Fugett took over TLC Beatrice International Foods, the largest black-owned and black managed business in the United States at the time. At its peak, TLC Beatrice had $2.2 billion in sales and was number 512 on Fortune magazine's list of 1,000 largest.

In addition to his law practice, Fugett is the most recent past President of the Retired Players Steering Committee of the National Football League Players Association, as legal counsel and advisor to Wall Street investment services firm GFS Acquisition Partners, managing director of Axum Capital Partners, and on the Leadership Council for the American Diabetes Association Maryland Chapter.

Fugett currently resides in Baltimore with his wife Carlotta. His two sons are Joseph "Russell" and Reginald. His only daughter Maude "Audie" Jones married Adam Jones on December 27, 2014. Fugett currently has five grandchildren.

Fugett is the son of Carolyn and Jean S. Fugett Sr. and the grandson of Joseph R. Fugett.
