= Steve Wojciechowski =

American basketball player and coach (born 1976)

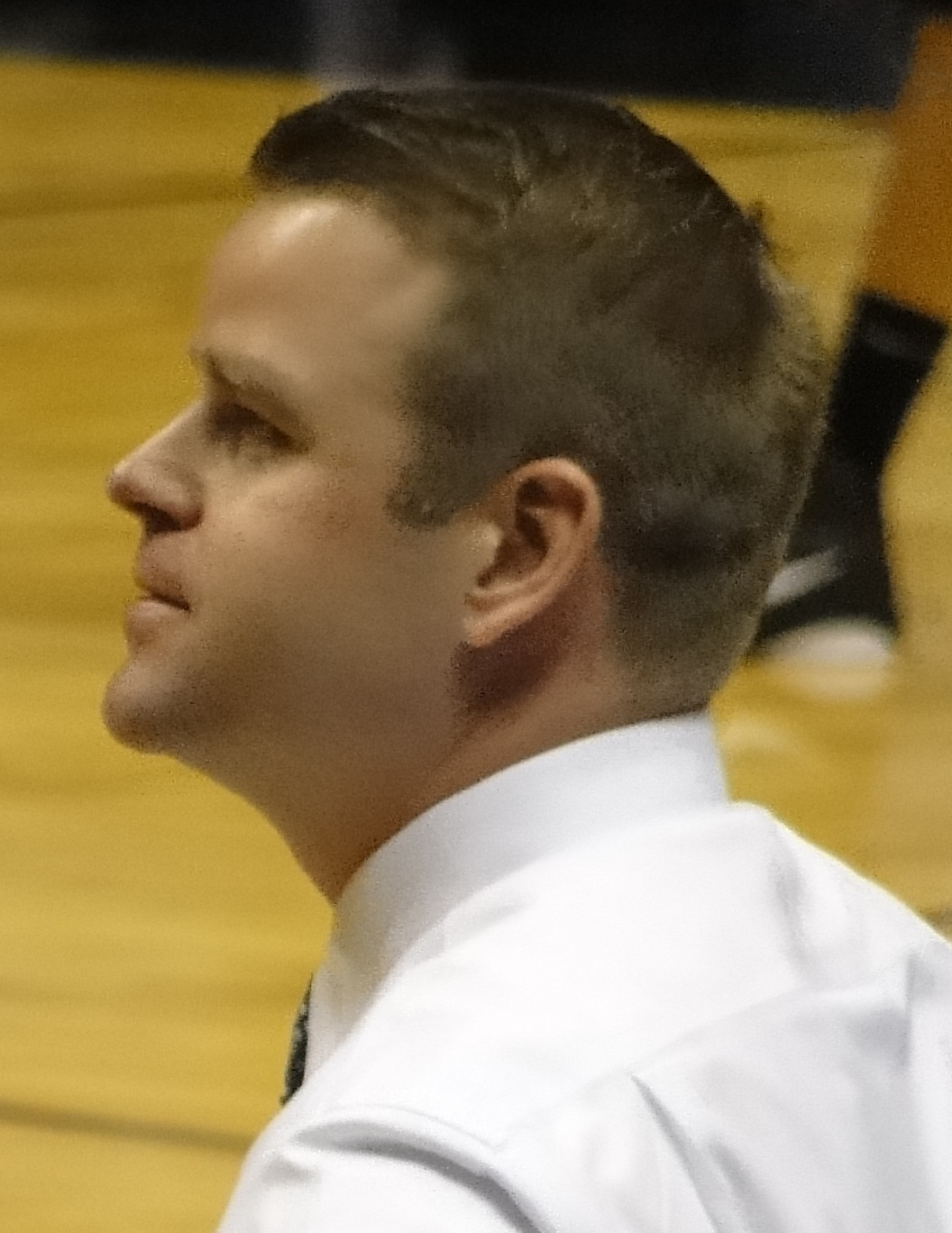
- Wojciechowski in 2010

Utah Jazz
- Title: Assistant coach
- League: NBA

Personal information
- Born: August 11, 1976 (age 50) Severna Park, Maryland, U.S.
- Listed height: 5 ft 11 in (1.80 m)
- Listed weight: 170 lb (77 kg)

Career information
- High school: Cardinal Gibbons (Baltimore, Maryland)
- College: Duke (1994–1998)
- NBA draft: 1998: undrafted
- Playing career: 1998–1999
- Position: Point guard
- Coaching career: 1999–present

Career history

Playing
- 1998–1999: Pekaes Pruszków

Coaching
- 1999–2014: Duke (assistant)
- 2014–2021: Marquette
- 2023–2025: Salt Lake City Stars
- 2025–present: Utah Jazz (assistant)

Career highlights
- NABC Defensive Player of the Year (1998); Second-team All-ACC (1997); Third-team All-ACC (1998); McDonald's All-American (1994)
Medals
Men's basketball
Representing United States
FIBA Americas U18 Championship
Gold medal – first place	1994 Santa Rosa	Team competition

Steven Michael Wojciechowski (born August 11, 1976), commonly known as Wojo, is an American basketball coach and former player. In 2025, he joined the Utah Jazz coaching staff as an assistant coach following the NBA Call-Up. Wojciechowski previously served as the head coach of the Salt Lake City Stars, the NBA G League affiliate of the Jazz. He previously played and coached under head coach Mike Krzyzewski at Duke University and was the head coach at Marquette University for seven seasons. He was a point guard from 1994 to 1998.

== Biography ==
=== Playing career ===
==== High school ====
Wojciechowski is a 1994 graduate of the Cardinal Gibbons School in Baltimore, Maryland, where he played under Baltimore Catholic League head coach Ray Mullis. Rated one of the top high school players in the country, Wojciechowski was named to the East squad of the 1994 McDonald's All-American Team, playing against future Duke teammates Trajan Langdon and Ricky Price.

==== Duke ====
Highly recruited out of high school, Wojciechowski signed to play with Duke.

Midway through Wojciechowski's freshman season, the Duke coach, Mike Krzyzewski, had to take a medical leave. The team stumbled to a 13–18 record, the school's only losing season since 1982–83; it was also Duke's only non-NCAA-tournament season between 1983 and 2021.

During Wojciechowski's last three years, the Duke Blue Devils achieved an 74–26 record. A captain during his senior year, Wojciechowski led that 1997–98 team to a 32–4 record and a #1 ranking in the final AP regular season poll. In the NCAA tournament, the Duke team reached the South Regional final, losing to the eventual champion, Kentucky, 86–84.

During that senior year, Wojciechowski was named NABC Defensive Player of the Year honors and was an honorable mention All-American.

Overall, Wojo appeared in 128 games for Duke, starting 88. He is ranked eighth at Duke for career steals (203) and eighth for career assists (505). He also achieved the second highest number of steals in a single season with 82 in 1997.

A first-generation college student, Wojciechowski earned his bachelor's degree from Duke in 1998.

Following his graduation from Duke, Wojciechowski played professional basketball in Poland for a year.

=== Coaching career ===
==== Duke ====
He returned to Duke in 1999 as an intern in the Duke Management Company and was a basketball analyst on the Duke Radio Network.

Wojciechowski was then offered a coaching job by Krzyzewski and began his career as an assistant coach in 1999. He was promoted to associate coach in 2008. During his 14 years on the Duke bench, Wojciechowski primarily coached Duke's frontcourt players. Two of them, Shane Battier and Shelden Williams, were national defensive players of the year, while those who went on to successful NBA careers include Carlos Boozer, Rodney Hood, Josh McRoberts, Jabari Parker, Mason Plumlee, Miles Plumlee, and Lance Thomas. Compiling an overall record of 441–92 during his time as an assistant and associate head coach, the Blue Devils won the NCAA championship in 2001 and 2010.

Wojo was also an assistant on the USA National senior team from 2006 to 2014, including the teams that won the Olympic gold medal in 2008 and 2012.

==== Marquette ====
On April 1, 2014, Wojciechowski was hired as the new Marquette head basketball coach, replacing Buzz Williams, who left for Virginia Tech. At Marquette, he compiled a 124–93 record, including two NCAA tournament invitations. This included a losing record during his first season followed by 5 consecutive winning seasons. However, with no Big East titles and an 0–2 NCAA Tournament record in 7 seasons, Wojciechowski was fired at the conclusion of the 2020–2021 season.

==== Salt Lake City Stars ====
In June 2023, Wojciechowski was named head coach of the Salt Lake City Stars, the NBA G League affiliate of the Utah Jazz. He became the fifth individual to hold the position since the franchise relocated to Salt Lake City in 2016. During his first media appearance on 97.5 The KSL Sports Zone, Wojciechowski spoke about the developmental focus of the G League and its alignment with the Jazz organization:

“The G League is one of the best basketball leagues in the world when you think about the talent and the quality of the game. In the G League, it is truly a developmental league and so the fact that you’re mission is helping people reach their potential, get better, grow, and develop as the number one priority for both the Stars and the Jazz, you don’t get that combination anywhere else,”

Wojciechowski served as head coach of the Stars for two seasons (2023–2025), compiling a 41–17 overall record. Under his leadership, the team secured its first-ever playoff victory during the 2025 season. On June 6, 2025, Jazz head coach Will Hardy announced that Wojciechowski would join the Jazz's coaching staff as an assistant for the 2025–26 NBA season.

He is the second Salt Lake City Stars head coach to be elevated to the Jazz’s staff, following his predecessor Scott Morrison.

== Head coaching record ==
Record table
Season	Team	Overall	Conference	Standing	Postseason
Marquette Golden Eagles (Big East Conference) (2014–2021)
2014–15	Marquette	13–19	4–14	T–9th	
2015–16	Marquette	20–13	8–10	7th	
2016–17	Marquette	19–13	10–8	T–3rd	NCAA Division I Round of 64
2017–18	Marquette	21–14	9–9	T–6th	NIT Quarterfinals
2018–19	Marquette	24–10	12–6	2nd	NCAA Division I Round of 64
2019–20	Marquette	18–12	8–10	T–6th	
2020–21	Marquette	13–14	8–11	9th	
Marquette:		128–95 (.574)	59–68 (.465)		
Total:		128–95 (.574)			
