= Faoud Bacchus =

Guyanese cricketer

Personal information
- Full name: Sheik Faoud Ahamul Fasiel Bacchus
- Born: 31 January 1954 (age 72); Georgetown, Guyana
- Batting: Right-handed
- Bowling: Right-arm medium pace

International information
- National side: West Indies
- Test debut (cap 171): 15 April 1978 v Australia
- Last Test: 30 January 1982 v Australia
- ODI debut (cap 23): 22 February 1978 v Australia
- Last ODI: 25 June 1983 v India

Domestic team information
- Years: Team
- 1971–1980: Demerara
- 1972–1983: Guyana
- 1984–1985: Western Province
- 1985–1986: Border
- 1985–1986: Impalas

Career statistics
Competition	Tests	ODIs	FC	LA
Matches	19	29	111	66
Runs scored	782	612	5,944	1,871
Batting average	26.06	26.60	35.17	33.41
100s/50s	1/3	0/3	8/37	1/12
Top score	250	80*	250	132
Balls bowled	6	0	470	96
Wickets	0	–	8	6
Bowling average	–	–	24.62	16.50
5 wickets in innings	0	–	0	0
10 wickets in match	0	–	0	0
Best bowling	–	–	2/18	3/28
Catches/stumpings	17/–	10/–	88/–	18/–
Medal record
Men's Cricket
Representing West Indies
ICC Cricket World Cup
Winner	1979 England
Runner-up	1983 England and Wales
- Source: CricInfo, 17 October 2010

Sheik Faoud Ahamul Fasiel Bacchus (born 31 January 1954) is a Guyanese former cricketer who played for the West Indies and the United States. He was a member of the West Indies squad which won the 1979 Cricket World Cup.

== Early career ==
A right-handed batsman, he made his Test match debut for the West Indies aged 24 in the 1977/78 series against Australia. His best series was in 1978/79 against India, where he scored 96 in the second Test and 250 in the sixth Test, although overall he averaged 26.06 in his 19 Test matches and was dropped from the side after the 1981/82 tour of Australia.

He also played 29 One Day Internationals for the West Indies between 1977 and 1983, with a high score of 80 and an average of 26.60, winning two man of the match awards.

Bacchus' West Indies career came to an end after he joined the rebel tour to South Africa in 1983–84, defying the international sporting boycott of the apartheid state.

== US career ==
After migrating to the US, he continued playing at a professional level, captaining the United States in the 1997 and 2001 ICC Trophy tournaments.

At the 2002 ICC Americas Championship in Buenos Aires, the United States Cricket Team won its first international championship. Bacchus, captain, was named "Man of the Match" for making the highest individual score with 83 runs.

He joined the West Indies Over-50s World Cup squad to compete in South Africa against 11 other nations in 2020.

Bacchus also coached for the US team.
