= Baltimore Catholic League =

The Baltimore Catholic League (BCL), locally known as the Catholic League is a competitive basketball association composed of private Catholic high schools in the Baltimore, Maryland geographic area.

== History ==
The BCL was founded in 1972, after the Baltimore high school basketball season culminated in the MSA Championship game, Mt. St. Joseph High School defeated Dunbar High School. This game went on to be known as one of the most remarkable and controversial games in Baltimore high school basketball history. The impetus for the creation of the BCL arrived in the off-season. The goal was to make a separate division from the Maryland Scholastic Association (MSA), which served as the league for all high school athletics in the Baltimore area, public or private. The BCL created a division that was strictly for Baltimore area Catholic High Schools.

It is alleged that the Washington Catholic Athletic Conference (WCAC) was the model for the BCL. The BCL was originally composed of most of the schools in the list below, with the most recent additions being The John Carroll School in the 2010–11 season, and Our Lady of Mount Carmel in the 2011–12 season. Archbishop Curley High School, a founding member of the league, left the BCL in 1997.

The Cardinal Gibbons School (which closed in 2010) has the most BCL championships to date. The late O. Ray Mullis, former head coach at Cardinal Gibbons, has the most all-time wins of any coach in Baltimore City history (621 wins), while simultaneously claiming the most BCL championships (6). Other notable coaches in the league included Mark Amatucci, formerly of Calvert Hall College, who won a national championship in the early 80s, Cokey Robertson, formerly of St. Maria Goretti High School, Pat Clatchey of Mount Saint Joseph, William Wells formerly of St. Frances Academy, Jerry Savage formerly of Loyola Blakefield, and Dan Popera formerly of Archbishop Curley High School.

== Scheduling ==
The league works in cooperation with the Maryland Interscholastic Athletic Association (MIAA). Seven of the 8 teams participate in the MIAA A Conference, which results in each team playing each other twice, once home and once away. St. Maria Goretti is the only member of the BCL that does not participate in the MIAA.

After the conclusion of the season, the BCL sponsors a league tournament held at Loyola College's Reitz Arena. The event usually occurs after the MIAA Conference Championship with all 8 teams of the league participating. It is a single-elimination tournament with 4 quarterfinal matchups, 2 semi-final games, and a championship game. The Junior Varsity (JV) teams also play in the tournament, but held at the home of the higher seed for each game.

== BCL Game of the Week ==
Beginning with the 2006–2007 season, RC Sports Productions broadcasts a Baltimore Catholic League Game of the Week on Fox 1370 Sports Radio (formerly V1370) WVIE in Pikesville, Baltimore.

== Participating schools ==
- St. Frances Academy
- Calvert Hall College High School
- Loyola Blakefield
- St. Mary's High School
- Archbishop Spalding High School
- Mount Saint Joseph College
- The John Carroll School
- Our Lady of Mount Carmel High School
- Former members: Towson Catholic and Cardinal Gibbons School both closed in 2009 and 2010, respectively; Archbishop Curley High School left the league in 1997.

== Notable BCL alumni ==
Many former BCL players later played collegiate basketball at NCAA Division I schools, with some advancing to the NBA:

Towson Catholic Owls

- Donté Greene, '07 - NBA Sacramento Kings, NCAA Syracuse Orange
- Carmelo Anthony, '02 - NBA New York Knicks, Denver Nuggets, NCAA Syracuse Orange via Oak Hill Academy (Virginia)
- Malcolm Delaney, '07 - NCAA Virginia Tech Hokies

Calvert Hall Cardinals

- Juan Dixon, '97 - NBA Toronto Raptors, Portland Trail Blazers and Washington Wizards, NCAA Maryland Terrapins
- Duane Ferrell, '84 - NBA Atlanta Hawks, Indiana Pacers and Golden State Warriors, NCAA Georgia Tech Yellow Jackets
- Gary Neal, '02 - NBA San Antonio Spurs, NCAA La Salle Explorers and Towson Tigers
- Jack McClinton, '02 - selected by the San Antonio Spurs in the 2009 NBA draft., NCAA Miami Hurricanes
- Damion Lee, '10 - NCAA Louisville Cardinals, Drexel Dragons

Spalding Cavaliers

- Rudy Gay, '04 - NBA Memphis Grizzlies, NCAA UConn Huskies
- Aleksandar Pavlović, '99 - NBA Cleveland Cavaliers
- Cam Whitmore, ‘23 - NBA Houston Rockets, NCAA Villanova Wildcats

Cardinal Gibbons Crusaders

- Norman Black, '75 - NBA Detroit Pistons, NCAA Saint Joseph's College
- Dylon Cormier, '10 - NCAA Loyola Greyhounds
- Quintin Dailey, '79 - NBA Chicago Bulls, L.A. Clippers and Seattle SuperSonics, NCAA San Francisco Dons
- Steve Wojciechowski, '94 - NCAA Duke University Blue Devils, former head coach at Marquette University

Archbishop Curley Friars

- Kwame Evans (played at Curley from 1987 to 1989) - NCAA George Washington University Colonials - made 3 trips to the NCAA Tournament ('93, '94, and '96) with a Sweet 16 appearance in 1993. Evans currently ranks fifth on GW's all-time scoring list and was inducted into the university's athletic Hall of Fame in 2014.

Goretti Gaels

- Rodney Monroe, '87 - NBA Atlanta Hawks, NCAA NC State Wolfpack
- Rodney Gibson, '01 - NCAA St. Francis Red Flash
- Derrick Davis, '03 - NCAA South Carolina St. Bulldogs
- Gene Johnson, '06 - NCAA Morgan State Bears
- Kevin Breslin, '08 - Semi-Pro Washington Generals, NCAA Washington College Shoremen

Mount Saint Joseph Gaels

- Torrey Butler, '99 - NCAA Coastal Carolina
- Will Thomas, '04 - NCAA George Mason Patriots
- Henry Sims, '08 - NBA Philadelphia 76ers, NCAA Georgetown University
- Phil Booth, '14 - NCAA Villanova Wildcats
- Jalen Smith, '18 - NCAA Maryland Terrapins

St. Frances Panthers

- Devin Gray, '91 - NBA Sacramento Kings, San Antonio Spurs, and Houston Rockets. NCAA Clemson
- Sean Mosley, '08 - NCAA Maryland Terrapins
- Mark Karcher, '97 - NBA Philadelphia 76ers, NCAA Temple Owls
- Dante Holmes, '16 - NCAA North Carolina Central University
- Derik Queen, '24 - NBA New Orleans Pelicans, NCAA Maryland Terrapins (via Montverde Academy)
