= Rodney Monroe =

American basketball player (born 1968)

Personal information
- Born: April 16, 1968 (age 58) Baltimore, Maryland, U.S.
- Listed height: 6 ft 3 in (1.91 m)
- Listed weight: 185 lb (84 kg)

Career information
- High school: St. Maria Goretti (Hagerstown, Maryland)
- College: NC State (1987–1991)
- NBA draft: 1991: 2nd round, 30th overall pick
- Drafted by: Atlanta Hawks
- Playing career: 1991–2007
- Position: Shooting guard
- Number: 12

Career history
- 1991–1992: Atlanta Hawks
- 1993: Canberra Cannons
- 1993–1994: Rochester Renegade
- 1994–1995: Hapoel Gvat/Yagur
- 1995–1997: Florida Beach Dogs
- 1997–1998: Keravnos
- 1998–1999: Libertas Forlì
- 1999–2002: Fabriano Basket
- 2002–2003: Euro Roseto
- 2003–2005: Conad Rimini
- 2005–2006: Plasencia
- 2007: Pepsi Caserta

Career highlights
- CBA Newcomer of the Year (1994); All-NBL Third Team (1993); Second-team All-American – UPI, NABC (1991); Third-team All-American – AP (1991); ACC Player of the Year (1991); 2× First-team All-ACC (1989, 1991); Second-team All-ACC (1990); No. 21 jersey honored by NC State Wolfpack; First-team Parade All-American (1987); McDonald's All-American (1987)
- Stats at NBA.com
- Stats at Basketball Reference
Medals
Men's basketball
Representing United States
FIBA Americas Championship
Silver medal – second place	1989 Mexico City	National team

Rodney Eugene Monroe (born April 16, 1968) is an American former professional basketball player who played in the National Basketball Association (NBA) and other leagues. He was selected by the Atlanta Hawks in the second round (30th pick overall) of the 1991 NBA draft.

A 6-foot-3-inch (1.91 m) shooting guard, Monroe played only one year in the NBA with the Hawks during the 1991–92 season, appearing in 38 games and scoring a total of 131 points. Monroe also played professionally in Australia, Greece, Israel, Italy (for Carne Montana Forli (1998–1999)), Fabriano Basket a.k.a. Banca Marche Fabriano (1999–2002) and Euro Roseto (2002–2003), Spain, and the Philippines. Currently, Monroe is the director of basketball operations and men's basketball coach at SouthLake Christian Academy in Huntersville, North Carolina.

Monroe played collegiately at North Carolina State and was the Atlantic Coast Conference Player of the Year in 1991 after averaging 27.0 points per game. He broke David Thompson's school scoring record at NC State and is fourth on the ACC's all-time scoring list with 2,551 career points. In 2002, Monroe was named to the ACC 50th Anniversary men's basketball team as one of the fifty greatest players in Atlantic Coast Conference history.

Monroe attended St. Maria Goretti High School in Hagerstown, Maryland and played in the competitive Baltimore Catholic League.
