= Joseph R. Fugett =

American activist (1890–1975)

Joseph Fugett
- Born: June 17, 1890; Baldwinsville, New York, US
- Died: July 5, 1975 (aged 85); Baltimore City, Maryland, US
- Education: B.S. in Agriculture and Science, Cornell University
- Parent(s): Joseph Martin; Josephine Bakeman

Joseph Russell Fugett (June 17, 1890 – July 5, 1975) was an American activist and educator. In 1920, he became the principal of the all-black Gay Street School in West Chester, Pennsylvania.

== Early life ==
Joseph R. Fugett was born on June 17, 1890, in Baldwinsville, New York. His father, Joseph Martin, was formally enslaved in the state of Tennessee; and his mother, Josephine (the daughter of Oliver Bakeman and Sarah Day Bakeman), was from the state of New York. His mother, Josephine, was a direct descendant of Revolutionary War participant, Henry Bakeman. In 1900, Fugett lived in Van Buren, New York with his parents and siblings (Frank M., Bessie J., James K. and Sarah E.). He graduated from Waterloo High School.

== Education and career ==
Fugett attended Cornell University, where he studied agriculture and became a member of the Alpha Phi Alpha fraternity, the first black intercollegiate Greek-lettered fraternity. He served as general secretary of Alpha Phi Alpha from 1912 to 1913, as treasurer at the Fourth General Convention, and as incorporator when the fraternity was incorporated on April 3, 1912. On October 21, 1908, Fugett was an initiate at the Alpha chapter annual banquet.

After graduating from Cornell, Fugett became an animal husbandry instructor at the Tuskegee Institute in Alabama. He later taught at Bordentown High School in New Jersey, and at Delaware State University. He came to West Chester in 1920, and earned a master's degree in education from the University of Pennsylvania in 1926. Fugett was an active member in both the National Education Association and the Elementary School Principals Association. He was also a charter member and President of the Suburban Philadelphia Elementary School Principals Association. The State Department of Public Instruction invited Fugett to be a part of a statewide committee whose purpose was to prepare educational materials on cultural competency. In 1945, Fugett served as secretary to Major Richard R. Wright at the United Nations Conference on International Organization. During the commencement ceremony at Cheyney University in 1957, Fugett was cited for "advancing education, serving the community, and enlightening human relations." During the second year of the West Chester NAACP, Fugett served as one of the branch officers.

== Legacy ==
When Fugett retired as principal of the Gay Street School in June 1965, the local school board renamed the school to Fugett Elementary School in his honor. At a ceremony to formally rename the school, it was proclaimed that October 13, 1965 would be declared "Joseph R. Fugett Day."

When Fugett Elementary School closed in 1977, the Fugett name was transferred to another local school. Thus, East Junior High became J. R. Fugett Middle School. Fugett's name is included on a plaque which lists notable West Chester area teachers. For many years, Fugett lived in West Chester, Pennsylvania, with his wife, Hazel Estelle Schloss Fugett (November 11, 1892 – January 9, 1965), and two sons, Joseph R. Fugett Jr. and Jean Schloss Fugett Sr. (November 25, 1927 – July 19, 2016). In 2004, Fugett's son, Jean Schloss Fugett Sr., became the first black man to join the Maryland division of the Sons of the American Revolution (SAR). Jean Schloss Fugett Jr. (son of Jean Schloss Fugett Sr. and grandson of Joseph R. Fugett) is a lawyer and a former professional American football player.

Fugett died on July 5, 1975.
