= Heartland Cricket League =

Cricket organization

The Heartland Cricket League is a non-profit, nine-clubs with 10 teams cricket organization based in the states of Iowa and Nebraska. The league was formalized in 2004.

== History ==
Cricket has been played in the United States of America since the early 1700s . Cricket has only been played in Heartland USA since the mid-1800 .

Games were initially played on grassy pitches, which were often uncut with a jute mat laid on top. In 2004 the league switched to concrete-based, carpeted wickets. Neutral umpires were introduced in 2006.

The catalyst that spurred the creation of the Heartland cricket League in 2004 was for hope and expectation to have our players to try out for the US National Cricket team by participating in tournaments in mid-west USA, which were part of the USACA's [www.USACA.org] former Central Zone. Over the years since then the league has made major strides - hosting invitationals, festivals and tournaments and has played in tournaments in Nebraska, Iowa, Kansas and Colorado states.

=== Central West Regional Tournament ===
HCL Tornadoes under Urvil Patel toured Houston to participate in the 2013 CW regional tournament, participating teams were Dallas, Houston, Austin, Colorado, HCL and CW Presidents XI

=== Inter League Tours ===
HCL continues to host and tour Colorado Cricket League and Tri-State Cricket League (Wichita, KS).

==== 2011 Inter League ====
1. HCL toured to Wichita, KS to participate in the inaugural twister cup. HCL won the 1st twister cup.
2. Colorado Cricket League toured Omaha, NE and participated in the inaugural heartland challenge cup. HCL won the trophy.

==== 2012 Inter League ====
1. HCL toured to Colorado to defend the Heartland Challenge but were unavailable to so, CCL won the heartland challenge 2012.
2. HCL toured Wichita, KS to play the Tri-State Cricket League and defended the twister cup by winning the game.

==== 2013 Inter League ====
1. HCL hosted Colorado for the Heartland Challenge Cup and the Derozairo-Riley T20 cup, CCL won the heartland challenge 2013 and T20 Patel Cup.
2. HCL toured Wichita, KS to play the Tri-State Cricket League and defended the twister cup by winning the game an all the T20's under Urvil Patel.

=== Championships ===
HCL participates in many inter-league trophies in states of Kansas, Nebraska, Colorado and Iowa.

==== League Champions ====
2021 - Iowa Bulls (4)
2020 - BlackCaps (1)
2019 - Vikings (1) and Knights Cricket Club (9)
2018 - Iowa Bulls (2) and Knights Cricket Club (8)
2017 - Iowa State University Cricket Club (3)
2016 - Iowa State University Cricket Club (2)
2015 - Iowa State University Cricket Club (1)
2014 - Knights Cricket Club (7)
2013 - Knights Cricket Club (6)
2012 - Knights Cricket Club (5)
2011 - Cedar Rapids Kings (2)
2010 - Cedar Rapids Kings (1)
2009 - Iowa Bulls (1)
2008 - Elite Cricket Club (1)
2007 - Knights Cricket Club (4)
2006 - Cedar Rapids All-Starts (1)
2005 - Knights Cricket Club (3)
2004 - Knights Cricket Club (2)
2003 - Knights Cricket Club (1)

==== T20 Champions ====
1. 2021 Spring T20 - Iowa Bulls, Mega T20 - Jaguars
2. 2020 Summer T20 - Blackcaps
3. 2019 Spring T20 - Vikings, Mega T20 - Knights Cricket Club/Thalaivas (Joint Winners)
4. 2018 Spring/Mega T20 - Knights Cricket Club
5. 2012 Mega T20 - Iowa Bulls
6. 2012 T20 - Cedar Rapids Kings
7. 2011 - Nebraska Cricket Club

==== T30 Champions ====
1. 2021 - Iowa Bulls
2. 2019 - Knights Cricket Club
3. 2018 - Iowa Bulls

== Organization ==
In 2004 HCL was officially incorporated as a non-profit organization. The league runs a cricket tournament which takes place from May to September each year and involves approximately 200 players.

=== Clubs and teams ===
The HCL is made up of eight clubs.

- Nebraska Cricket Club
- Knights Cricket Club
- Iowa State University Cricket Club
- Cedar Rapids Kings Cricket Club
- Iowa Bulls Cricket Club
- Simply Play Cricket Club
- Waterloo Warriors Cricket Club
- Omaha Cricket Club

=== Current Teams ===
- Iowa Bulls
- Blackcaps
- Vikings
- Thalaivas
- Iowa Panthers
- wolves
- KCC
- ISU
