= Darren Beazley =

Australian businessman and sports administrator

CEO of USACA
- In office February 2013 – March 2014
- Preceded by: Don Lockerbie

Personal details
- Born: Western Australia
- Education: Edith Cowan University (MBA)

Darren Beazley is an Australian businessman and sports administrator.

== Early life ==
Darren Beazley was born in Nambour in Queensland, but spent his formative years in Geraldton, Western Australia, where he graduated from high school and later university. He was an accomplished sportsman playing Australian Rules Football with Swan Districts Football Club and cricket with the Midland Guildford, Claremont Cottesloe and Scarborough Cricket Clubs, winning an A Grade Premiership with Scarborough in 1994/5.

== Career ==
After earning his MBA from Edith Cowan University, Beazley went on to serve as a manager or board member at various private companies, charities, and sports clubs. From 1994 to 1998 he was employed with the West Australian Football Commission, and from there was assigned by the AFL to manage the Tasmanian Football Development Foundation, a charity that develops programs and clinics for Australian youth athletes. After Tasmania, Beazley moved to America and worked for tech company Funge Systems, Inc. for three years, and then was hired as a general manager for the Western Australian Cricket Association.

He has also worked as the general manager of strategic partnerships for the Fremantle Football Club, where he led the club's expansion into the South African market. In 2011 Beazley was the Director of Commercial Operations for the Perth ISAF Sailing World Championships, a London 2012 Olympic Games qualifying event. Most recently he was employed as the national sales director for clean energy company Enerji Limited.

In 2012, the USA Cricket Association (USACA) began recruitment for a new permanent chief executive, which they had been without since previous CEO Don Lockerbie left the organization in 2010. In December 2012 the recruitment committee, composed of USACA board members and an ICC representative, chose Beazley for the position. He moved into the job in February 2013. but left fourteen months later, in April 2014.

Beazley was CEO of the Western Australian Swimming Association (Swimming WA) for six-and-a-half years, from May 2014 to November 2020. He departed Swimming WA to take up a position at Heatleys Safety & Industrial, which has been a sponsor of swimming in Western Australia.

== Personal life ==
Beazley is a member of the Australian Institute of Company Directors and an Associate Fellow of the Australian Institute of Management. He also serves on the volunteer board of Celebrate WA, an organization that honors western Australian leadership. He is the president of the Asthma Foundation of Western Australia, a position that interested him because of his own lifelong struggle with asthma.

Beazley is married with two children and relocated to Florida during his time with USACA.

After 4 years as Vice President, in June 2022 he was elected President of the Scarborough Cricket Club.
