= List of United States national cricket captains =

This is a list of all cricketers who have captained the United States in an official international match. These include One Day Internationals and ICC Trophy games.

== One Day International ==
The United States played their first ODI on September 10, 2004 as part of the ICC Intercontinental Cup.

American ODI Captains
Number	Name	Year	Played	Won	Tied	Lost	No Result
1	Richard Staple	2004	2	0	0	2	0
2	Saurabh Netravalkar	2019–2021	19	9	0	10	0
3	Monank Patel	2022–present	28	13	2	13	0
4	Aaron Jones	2023	2	0	0	2	0
5	Saiteja Mukkamalla	2026	2	1	0	1	0
Overall			53	23	2	28	0

== ICC 6 Nations Challenge ==
The United States participated in the final edition of this tournament between the top Associate nations from February 29-March 6, 2004.

American ICC 6 Nations Captains
Number	Name	Year	Played	Won	Tied	Lost	No Result
1	Richard Staple	2004	5	3	0	2	0
Overall			5	3	0	2	0

== ICC Trophy ==
The United States debuted in the ICC Trophy in the 1979 tournament.

American ICC Trophy Captains
Number	Name	Year	Played	Won	Tied	Lost	No Result
1	Anil Lashkari	1979–1979	4	2	0	1	1
2	Kamran Rasheed	1982–1990	5	1	0	3	1
3	Sew Shivnarine	1986–1990	14	11	0	2	1
4	Zamin Amin	1993–1994	7	5	0	2	0
5	Faoud Bacchus	1996–2001	8	3	0	5	0
6	Richard Staple	2001–2005	14	4	0	10	0
7	Steve Massiah	2000–2011					
8	Sushil Nadkarni	2011–2017					
9	Ibrahim Khaleel	2017–2018					
10	Saurabh Netravalkar	2018–present					
Overall			51	26	0	23	2

== ICC World Twenty20 Qualifier ==
The United States first entered the ICC World Twenty20 Qualifier in 2010. This table also includes records from the T20 Americas region qualifying tournaments.

American Twenty20 Captains
No.	Name	Year	Played	Won	Tied	Lost	NR
1	Steve Massiah	2010	3	1	0	2	0
2	Sushil Nadkarni	2012	8	1	0	7	0
3	Aditya Mishra	2012	1	1	0	0	0
4	Orlando Baker	2013	8	1	0	7	0
5	Muhammad Ghous	2015	6	3	0	3	0
6	Monank Patel	2022	4	3	0	1	0
7	Aaron Jones	2022	1	0	0	1	0

== See also ==
- List of United States of America ODI cricketers
- United States national cricket team
