= American Premier League =

20 overs United States cricket league

American Premier League (APL)
- Most recent season or competition: 2023
- Sport: Cricket
- Founded: 2009
- Founder: Jay Mir
- First season: 2021
- Owner: Merit Sports Group
- No. of teams: 7
- Country: United States
- Most recent champion: Premium Afghans (2023)
- Most titles: Premium Afghans (1 title)
- Broadcaster: Sports 18
- Tournament format: T20
- Website: americanpremiereleague.us

The American Premier League (APL) is a professional Twenty20 cricket league in the United States. The first league was scheduled to take place between 6 October and 24 October 2009, which was later postponed. The management revamped the brand in 2020 and went through the official launch during the spring of 2021. The teams were named after cricket spectators spread across the United States (Indians, Paks, Windies, and Afghans, Aussies, Canadians, and Americans).

In November 2024, Jay Mir, the owner of American Sports and Entertainment Group, sold the American Premier League to Merit Sports Group (MSG), a U.S. based sports company, for an investment of US$100 million over the next ten years, which will include running professional men's and women's T20 and T10 tournaments, building a world class sports facility in New York, and creating a network of American Premier League branded cricket academies across United States.

== History ==
In 2009 APL announced an imminent three-year deal with minor league club the Staten Island Yankees who own the venue. The league had planned to play twice a year at baseball's Richmond County Bank Ballpark. Besides renowned staff and players, six teams were expected to take part in the first event: Premium Pakistan, Premium India, Premium Bengal, Premium West Indies, Premium World and Premium America, but the event did not materialize.

In 2009 the ICC announced support for the creation of a Twenty20 cricket competition in the US to compete against the APL, and in December 2010 the board of the United States of America Cricket Association that it had signed a $10 million deal with New Zealand Cricket and other investors as stakeholders, creating a new body called Cricket Holdings America to manage all commercial rights for cricket in USA, including Twenty20 rights, in perpetuity.

No American Premier League matches were played in 2010. In 2011 no further matches were announced and the venture appeared defunct.

=== Controversy ===
The American Premier League established contact with the USA Cricket Association, but had not submitted a formal approval. In 2009 the International Cricket Council (ICC) halt national players to participate until further release instructions and approvals.

== Revamped ==
American Premier League's Inaugural season was initially scheduled for spring of 2020, but was postponed due to the COVID-19 pandemic. On 15 February 2021, the CEO of APL Jay Mir signed an exclusive multi-year contract with the Minor League Baseball team New Jersey Jackals. This contract was to host the American Premiere League at the Yogi Berra Stadium in Little Falls, New Jersey. On 15 March 2021, the American Premiere League was officially launched at a dinner party in Montclair, New Jersey. Following the announcement, the American Premiere League sold all seven teams to various entrepreneurs.

== Tournament format ==
Each team faces every other team once in the round games. The top four teams advance to the semifinals. The two winners face each other off in the finals. The inaugural season of the American Premier League had total prizes worth $200,000.

=== Seasons ===
On 13 September 2021, the American Premier League's inaugural tournament kicked off with an opening ceremony. The tournament started on 20 September with three back-to-back matches every day. Premium Afghans emerged champions of American Premier League 2023 as they beat Premium Indians in the final of the tournament (1 January) at Moosa Stadium in Texas.

The 2nd edition of the American Premier League was held in Moosa Stadium in Texas. The tournament started on December 19 with first editions Champions Windees challenged The Americans. The second season of the American Premier League brought the cricket craze to the America. Many International and Local stars drafted for the tournament.

Some of the big names were such as, Ben Cutting, Samit Patel, Aron Jones, Sohail Tanveer, Mohammad Irfan, Usman Ghani, Akel Hussain, Rakhem Cornwal, William Perkens, Hayden Walsh, Mehran Khan, Ravi Bopara, Stephen Wiig, Gerhard Erasmus and more.

The 2024 season was scheduled to take place from December 19 to 31. It was cancelled and no matches have occurred since December 31, 2023.

== Teams ==
Team	Debut	Owner	Captain
Premium Indians	2021	Sam Singh	S. Sreesanth
Premium Windies	2021	Michael Virk	Jahmar Hamilton
Premium Afghans	2023	Spetmaan Bardasht	Mohammad Nabi
Premium Aussies	2021	Munish Soni	Ben Cutting
Premium Canadians	2023	Rocky Walia	Navneet Dhaliwal
Premium Americans	2021	Eraj Abidi	Navin Stewart
Premium PAKs	2021	Muhammad Ali	Sohail Tanvir

== See also ==
- History of United States cricket
- Cricket in the United States
- Impact of the COVID-19 pandemic on cricket
- Major League Cricket
