= Atlantic Division =

The term Atlantic Division may refer to:

- Atlantic Branch, a railway
- Atlantic Division (NBA), the division by this name in the NBA
- Atlantic Division, Air Transport Command, an Army Air Forces command from 1945 to 1948
- Atlantic Division, Military Air Transport Service, a United States Air Force command from 1948 to 1958
- Atlantic Division (NHL), the current division by this name in the NHL
- One of the two divisions in the Atlantic Coast Conference
