= NYPD Cricket League =

NYPD Cricket
- Countries: New York City, United States
- Administrator: Raymond W. Kelly, NYPD
- Format: Twenty20
- First edition: 2008
- Number of teams: 10
- Qualification: Ages 14-19
- Website: NYPD Cricket Blog
- 2009 season

NYPD Cricket League or NYPD Cricket or Cricket NYPD is a private Twenty20 cricket league formed by the New York City Police Department for teenagers from the Caribbean and South Asian American communities in New York City. It is a recreational league founded to develop better relations between New York Police and the immigrant communities within the city. The league is unofficial and is not recognized by United States of America Cricket Association. Its main goal is to have good understanding and relationship with immigrant communities living in New York City.

== NYPD Support ==
NYPD Community Affairs officers conducted outreach through community groups, youth programs and businesses in the five boroughs; they also promoted the tournament through local New York adult cricket leagues. The NYPD Twenty20 Cricket Cup is an extension of the Department's New Immigrant Outreach initiative that aims to establish positive ongoing relations with multiple ethnic groups including the Muslim and South Asian communities.

Participation for all players is free. The Police Department provides a professional color uniform kit with a hat, pants, and jersey as well as T-shirts and hats for the coaches. Coaches are volunteers. Cricket matches are played in Brooklyn at the Gateway Cricket Ground in Spring Creek Park and in Kissena Park in Queens using mats for pitches. Caps, jerseys, and pants are provided to players by the New York City Police Foundation, in various colors resembling international, professional team uniforms.

== 2008 season ==
New York City Police Commissioner Raymond W. Kelly introduced a citywide cricket league for teenagers, administered by the NYPD Community Affairs Bureau. The league was open to youth ages 14 to 19. A majority of those who have signed up to play that summer were of Pakistani, Bangladeshi and Guyanese descent; others are Trinidadian, Jamaican, and Indian (South Asian). Six teams of 15 players each – including the "Pak Brighton", "Punjab", "Cosmos", "Panthers", "Superstars", and "Knight Riders" played every Wednesday and Thursday, weather permitting, from July 23 until late August. The tournament culminated in a championship game on August 20, 2008. Matches were organized by the NYPD Community Affairs Bureau and umpired by New York State certified umpires. The cricket tournament was organized just after the NYPD United Soccer league, which was established in May.

== 2009 season ==
A large crowd turned out on June 13 to celebrate the launch of the 2009 NYPD Cricket season. Matches will be played in two locations this year in Brooklyn and Queens.

After a very successful inaugural season in 2008, the league expanded to include more players, teams, and games. The 2009 NYPD Cricket season will feature 10 teams and roughly 170 players from all five boroughs, an increase from the 2008 season when 6 teams and 100 players took part.

Teams including the "Pak Brighton", "Punjab", "Tigers", "Warriors", "Dragons", "West Indies Kings", "Superstars", "Lycans", and "Knight Riders" began play on June 23 and will culminate play with a championship game on August 25. As was the case in the 2008 season, the 2009 games followed a Twenty20 format and were umpired by New York State certified umpires.

== See also ==
- United States of America Cricket Association
- United States Youth Cricket Association
- USA Cricket
- United States national cricket team
- International Cricket Council
- Indian Premier League
- Major League Cricket
- Minor League Cricket
- Comparison between cricket and baseball
- Cricket World Cup
- ICC World Twenty20
