= 1979–80 La Salle Explorers men's basketball team =

American college basketball season

1979–80 La Salle Explorers men's basketball

ECC tournament champion

NCAA Division I tournament, First round
- Conference: East Coast Conference
- Record: 22–9 (7–4 ECC)
- Head coach: Lefty Ervin (1st season)
- Home arena: Convention Hall

1979–80 ECC men's basketball standings
	Conf.				Overall
Team	W		L	PCT	W		L	PCT
East
Saint Joseph's	10	–	1	.909	21	–	9	.700
Temple	8	–	3	.727	14	–	12	.538
La Salle †	7	–	4	.636	22	–	9	.710
Hofstra	6	–	5	.545	14	–	14	.500
American	5	–	6	.455	13	–	14	.481
Drexel	4	–	7	.364	12	–	15	.444
West
Lafayette	13	–	3	.813	21	–	8	.724
Bucknell	13	–	3	.813	20	–	7	.741
Delaware	7	–	9	.438	9	–	19	.321
Rider	5	–	11	.313	10	–	18	.357
Lehigh	2	–	14	.125	5	–	20	.200
West Chester	1	–	15	.063	3	–	23	.115
† 1980 ECC tournament winner Rankings from AP poll

The 1979–89 La Salle Explorers men's basketball team represented La Salle University as a member of the East Coast Conference during the 1979–80 NCAA Division I men's basketball season. The team was led by head coach Lefty Ervin and played their home games at The Palestra in Philadelphia, Pennsylvania. After finishing third in the ECC East division standings, the Explorers won the ECC tournament to receive a bid to the NCAA tournament. As the No. 11 seed in the Mideast region, La Salle lost to No. 6 seed eventual Final Four participant Purdue in the opening round. The team finished with a record of 22–9 (7–4 ECC).

== Roster ==
1979–80 La Salle Explorers men's basketball team
Players
Coaches

Pos.	#	Name	Height	Weight	Year	Previous school	Hometown
F	32	Michael Brooks	6 ft 7 in (2.01 m)	—	Sr		Philadelphia, Pennsylvania
C	54	Tom Piotrowski (redshirt)	7 ft 1 in (2.16 m)	235 lb (107 kg)	So	Great Valley	West Chester, Pennsylvania
G		Kurt Kanaskie	6 ft 1 in (1.85 m)	—	Sr	Cumberland Valley	Mechanicsburg, Pennsylvania

Head coach

- Lefty Ervin

Assistant coach(es)

Legend

- (C) Team captain
- (S) Suspended
- (I) Ineligible
- (W) Walk-on
- Injured
- Current redshirt

Roster

== Schedule and results ==
Date time, TV	Rank^{#}	Opponent^{#}	Result	Record	Site city, state
Regular season
Dec 3, 1979*		at Alabama	W 82–80	1–0	Memorial Coliseum; Tuscaloosa, Alabama
Dec 5, 1979*		at Bucknell	L 79–80	1–1	Davis Gym; Lewisburg, Pennsylvania
Dec 8, 1979*		Villanova	L 79–86	1–2	Palestra; Philadelphia, Pennsylvania
Dec 11, 1979*		Rider	W 102–59	2–2	Palestra; Philadelphia, Pennsylvania
Dec 14, 1979*		vs. Texas A&M	W 72–67	3–2	Marriott Center; Provo, Utah
Dec 15, 1979*		at No. 18 BYU	L 106–108	3–3	Marriott Center; Provo, Utah
ECC Tournament
Feb 25, 1980*		Drexel; First round	W 87–76	19–8	The Palestra; Philadelphia, Pennsylvania
Feb 28, 1980*		at Temple; Quarterfinals	W 70–62	20–8	McGonigle Hall; Philadelphia, Pennsylvania
Feb 29, 1980*		vs. Lafayette; Semifinals	W 70–62	21–8	The Palestra; Philadelphia, Pennsylvania
Mar 1, 1980*		vs. Saint Joseph's; Championship game	W 59–49	22–8	The Palestra; Philadelphia, Pennsylvania
NCAA Tournament
Mar 6, 1980*	(11 ME)	vs. (6 ME) No. 20 Purdue; First round	L 82–90	22–9	Mackey Arena; West Lafayette, Indiana
*Non-conference game. ^{#}Rankings from AP poll. (#) Tournament seedings in parentheses. ME=Mideast. All times are in Eastern Standard Time.
