= Tom Schneider (basketball) =

American basketball player and coach (1946–2015)

Biographical details
- Born: July 14, 1946; Pittsburgh, Pennsylvania, U.S.
- Died: March 17, 2015 (aged 68); Lakeland, Florida, U.S.

Playing career
- 1966–1969: Bucknell

Coaching career (HC unless noted)
- 1970–1971: Rockville HS
- 1971–1972: American (assistant)
- 1972–1979: George Washington (assistant)
- 1979–1983: Penn (assistant)
- 1983–1985: Lehigh
- 1985–1989: Penn
- 1989–1993: Loyola (MD)
- 1993–1994: SMU (assistant)
- 2005–2012: Polk State College (assistant)

Head coaching record
- Overall: 98–160 (.380) (college)
- Tournaments: 0–2 (NCAA Division I)

Accomplishments and honors

Championships
- ECC tournament (1985); Ivy League regular season (1987)

Thomas O. Schneider (July 14, 1946 – March 17, 2015) was an American basketball coach and player. From 1983 to 1993, he was a men's basketball head coach at NCAA Division I Mid-Atlantic mid-majors Lehigh, Penn and Loyola, with the first two each making a national tournament appearance.

== Early life ==
Schneider was born in Pittsburgh, Pennsylvania, on July 14, 1946. He matriculated at Bucknell University where he was a three-year letterman on the Bison men's basketball team from 1966 to 1969. He graduated with a Bachelor of Arts in Political Science in 1969. He later earned a Master of Arts in History from Georgetown University.

== Coaching career ==
Schneider began his coaching career at Rockville High School for one year in 1970–71. He stayed in the Washington metropolitan area when he returned to college basketball as an assistant coach with American in 1971–72 and George Washington from 1972 to 1979. His one year at American coincided with his graduate studies at Georgetown. He moved to the University of Pennsylvania in a similar capacity on the staffs of Bob Weinhauer for three seasons from 1979 to 1982 and Craig Littlepage for the 1982–83 campaign.

His first head coaching appointment was at Lehigh University where he was named on June 16, 1983, to succeed Brian Hill who had left to join the Penn State coaching staff two months earlier on April 13. In his second and last year at Lehigh in 1985, the Engineers qualified for its first-ever NCAA tournament by winning the East Coast Conference tourney despite a 12–18 overall record. Its season ended with a 68–43 East Regional first-round defeat to top-ranked defending national champion Georgetown. Assistant coach Fran McCaffery was promoted on September 14, six days after Schneider's departure from Lehigh.

Schneider returned to Penn on September 8, 1985, succeeding Littlepage who had left for Rutgers University two days earlier. In his second year at Penn in 1987, the Quakers captured the Ivy League championship before a 113–82 East Regional first-round loss to North Carolina at the NCAA tournament. Prior to assistant coach Fran Dunphy being promoted to replace him, Schneider compiled a 51–54 overall record in his four years with the Red and Blue.

He announced on March 15, 1989, his departure from the Quakers to succeed Mark Amatucci in a similar capacity at Loyola College in Maryland. A 1–10 start to the 1992–93 season resulted in Schneider's resignation prior to the opening of conference play. Athletic director Joe Boylan replaced him on an interim basis to complete a 2–25 campaign. The most notable player during Schneider's 3 1/2 years with the Greyhounds was starting point guard Michael Malone.

He was an assistant with John Shumate's staff at Southern Methodist University for one campaign in 1993–94. He was also a volunteer assistant with the Polk State College Eagles men's basketball team from 2005 to 2012.

== Later years and death ==
Schneider was a history professor at Polk State Lakeland Collegiate High School from its inception in 2005 to his death at age 68 of coronary artery disease on March 17, 2015.

== Head coaching record ==
Record table
Season	Team	Overall	Conference	Standing	Postseason
Lehigh Engineers (East Coast Conference) (1983–1985)
1983–84	Lehigh	4–23	3–13	9th	
1984–85	Lehigh	12–19	6–8	6th	NCAA Division I first round
Lehigh:		16–42 (.276)	9–21 (.300)		
Penn Quakers (Ivy League) (1985–1989)
1985–86	Penn	15–11	9–5	T–2nd	
1986–87	Penn	13–14	10–4	1st	NCAA Division I first round
1987–88	Penn	10–16	8–6	T–4th	
1988–89	Penn	13–13	9–5	3rd	
Penn:		51–54 (.486)	36–20 (.643)		
Loyola Greyhounds (Metro Atlantic Athletic Conference) (1989–1993)
1989–90	Loyola	4–24	2–14	6th (South)	
1990–91	Loyola	12–16	5–11	7th	
1991–92	Loyola	14–14	10–6	4th	
1992–93	Loyola	1–10	0–1		
Loyola:		31–64 (.326)	17–32 (.347)		
Total:		98–160 (.380)			
National champion Postseason invitational champion Conference regular season champion Conference regular season and conference tournament champion Division regular season champion Division regular season and conference tournament champion Conference tournament champion
