= 1974–75 Drexel Dragons men's basketball team =

American college basketball season

1974–75 Drexel Dragons men's basketball
- Conference: East Coast Conference
- East
- Record: 12–11 (0–6 ECC)
- Head coach: Ray Haesler (4th season)
- MVP: Tim Corlies
- Home arena: 32nd Street Armory

1974–75 ECC men's basketball standings
	Conf.				Overall
Team	W		L	PCT	W		L	PCT
East
American	5	–	1	.833	16	–	10	.615
La Salle †	5	–	1	.833	22	–	7	.759
Temple	4	–	2	.667	7	–	19	.269
Hofstra	3	–	3	.500	11	–	13	.458
Saint Joseph's	3	–	3	.500	8	–	17	.320
West Chester	1	–	5	.167	8	–	17	.320
Drexel	0	–	6	.000	12	–	11	.522
West
Lafayette	7	–	1	.875	22	–	6	.786
Rider	5	–	3	.625	16	–	11	.593
Bucknell	4	–	4	.500	14	–	12	.538
Delaware	4	–	4	.500	12	–	13	.480
Lehigh	0	–	8	.000	1	–	23	.042
† 1975 ECC tournament winner Rankings from AP Poll

The 1974–75 Drexel Dragons men's basketball team represented Drexel University during the 1974–75 men's basketball season. The Dragons, led by 4th year head coach Ray Haesler, played their home games at the 32nd Street Armory and were members of the East Coast Conference (ECC).

The team finished the season 12–11, and finished in 7th place in the ECC East in the regular season.

== Roster ==
1974–75 Drexel Dragons men's basketball team
Players
Coaches

Pos.	#	Name	Height	Weight	Year	Previous school	Hometown
C		Doug White (redshirt)	6 ft 6 in (1.98 m)	—	Sr	Eastern HS	Ashland, NJ
C	42	Doug Romanczuk	6 ft 5 in (1.96 m)	—	Jr	North Catholic HS	Philadelphia, PA
F		Terry Parks	6 ft 4 in (1.93 m)	—	Sr
G		Mike Feagans	6 ft 3 in (1.91 m)	—	Sr
F	23	Mike Kernan	6 ft 6 in (1.98 m)	—	Jr	North Catholic HS	Philadelphia, PA
F		Tim Corlies	6 ft 4 in (1.93 m)	—	Sr	St. Joseph's Prep
G	22	Joe Conahan	6 ft 1 in (1.85 m)	—	Fr	North Catholic HS	Philadelphia, PA
F	33	Tony Weldon	6 ft 6 in (1.98 m)	—	Fr	Germantown Stevens	Philadelphia, PA
G	15	Ray James	6 ft 0 in (1.83 m)	—	Fr	Asbury Park HS	Asbury Park, NJ
G	21	Tom Betley	6 ft 3 in (1.91 m)	—	Fr	Haddonfield Memorial HS	Haddonfield, NJ
G		Bob Ambler	5 ft 11 in (1.8 m)	—	Sr
C		Tom Vassalotti	6 ft 7 in (2.01 m)	—	So
G		Naish Berran	5 ft 10 in (1.78 m)	—	So

Head coach

- Ray Haesler (Rider)

Assistant coach(es)

Legend

- (C) Team captain
- (S) Suspended
- (I) Ineligible
- (W) Walk-on
- Injured
- Current redshirt

== Schedule ==
Date time, TV	Rank^{#}	Opponent^{#}	Result	Record	High points	High rebounds	High assists	Site (attendance) city, state
Regular season
November 30, 1974*		East Stroudsburg	W 76–66	1–0	16 – Romanczuk	–	–	32nd Street Armory; Philadelphia, PA
Unknown*		Widener	W 48–43	2–0	12 – Weldon	–	–	32nd Street Armory; Philadelphia, PA
Unknown*		Glassboro State	W 59–55	3–0	19 – Kernan	–	–	32nd Street Armory; Philadelphia, PA
December 10, 1974*		at Long Island	L 54–56	3–1	16 – Feagans	–	–	
Unknown*		at Wagner	W 73–65	4–1	15 – Romanczuk	–	–	
December 28, 1974*		at Iona	L 61–66	4–2	17 – Romanczuk	–	–	
January 2, 1975*		Delaware	W 66–64	5–2	16 – Feagans	–	–	32nd Street Armory; Philadelphia, PA
January 4, 1975*		at Rider	L 55–65	5–3	20 – Romanczuk	–	–	
January 8, 1975*		Swarthmore	W 47–40	6–3	8 – 2 Tied	–	–	32nd Street Armory; Philadelphia, PA
January 11, 1975*		at Colegate	W 50–46	7–3	16 – Kernan	–	–	
January 13, 1975		at West Chester	L 53–55	7–4 (0–1)	14 – Feagans	–	–	
January 18, 1975*		Gettysburg	W 60–55	8–4	18 – Kernan	–	–	32nd Street Armory; Philadelphia, PA
January 21, 1975*		at Bucknell	L 64–68	8–5	20 – Romanczuk	–	–	
January 25, 1975		at Hofstra	L 79–80	8–6 (0–2)	23 – Parks	–	–	
February 1, 1975*		at Johns Hopkins	W 83–79	9–6	21 – Parks	17 – Romanczuk	–	
February 5, 1975; 8:00 pm		No. 13 La Salle	L 63–80	9–7 (0–3)	22 – Romanczuk	–	–	32nd Street Armory; Philadelphia, PA
February 8, 1975		Saint Joseph's	L 51–55	9–8 (0–4)	16 – Romanczuk	–	–	32nd Street Armory (800); Philadelphia, PA
February 15, 1975*		Franklin & Marshall	W 63–56	10–8	18 – Romanczuk	–	–	32nd Street Armory; Philadelphia, PA
February 17, 1975		at American	L 76–77 ^{OT}	10–9 (0–5)	20 – Feagans	–	–	
Unknown*		at Philadelphia Textile	L 57–66	10–10	16 – Romanczuk	–	–	
Unknown*		at Albright	W 85–78 ^{OT}	11–10	33 – Romanczuk	–	–	
February 26, 1975*		at Lehigh	W 60–54	12–10	22 – Feagans	–	–	
March 1, 1975		vs. Temple	L 47–69	12–11 (0–6)	16 – Romanczuk	–	–	Palestra; Philadelphia, PA
*Non-conference game. ^{#}Rankings from AP. (#) Tournament seedings in parentheses. All times are in Eastern Time.

== Awards ==
Doug Romanczuk

- ECC All-Conference Second Team
