= 1977–78 Drexel Dragons men's basketball team =

American college basketball season

1977–78 Drexel Dragons men's basketball

Governor's Classic champions
- Conference: East Coast Conference
- East
- Record: 13–13 (2–3 ECC)
- Head coach: Eddie Burke (1st season)
- MVP: Bob Stephens
- Home arena: Daskalakis Athletic Center

1977–78 ECC men's basketball standings
	Conf.				Overall
Team	W		L	PCT	W		L	PCT
East
La Salle †	5	–	0	1.000	18	–	12	.600
Temple	4	–	1	.800	24	–	4	.857
American	2	–	3	.400	16	–	12	.571
Drexel	2	–	3	.400	13	–	15	.464
Saint Joseph's	2	–	3	.400	13	–	15	.464
Hofstra	0	–	5	.000	8	–	19	.296
West
Lafayette	10	–	0	1.000	23	–	8	.742
Delaware	5	–	5	.500	16	–	11	.593
Bucknell	5	–	5	.500	13	–	15	.464
Lehigh	5	–	5	.500	8	–	18	.308
Rider	4	–	6	.400	11	–	16	.407
West Chester	2	–	8	.200	6	–	19	.240
† 1978 ECC tournament winner Rankings from AP Poll

The 1977–78 Drexel Dragons men's basketball team represented Drexel University during the 1977–78 men's basketball season. The Dragons, led by 1st year head coach Eddie Burke, played their home games at the Daskalakis Athletic Center and were members of the East Coast Conference (ECC).

The team finished the season 13–13, and finished in 3rd place in the ECC East in the regular season.

== Roster ==
1977–78 Drexel Dragons men's basketball team
Players	Coaches
Pos. / # / Name / Height / Weight / Year / Previous school / Hometown; / / / — / —	Head coach: Eddie Burke (La Salle); Assistant coach(es) Legend: (C) Team captain; (S) Suspended; (I) Ineligible; (W) Walk-on; Injured; Current redshirt

== Schedule ==
Date time, TV	Rank^{#}	Opponent^{#}	Result	Record	High points	High rebounds	High assists	Site (attendance) city, state
Regular season
November 30, 1977*		at Delaware	L 78–91	0–1	–	–	–	
Unknown*		vs. Sacred Heart; Governor's Classic semifinal	W 102–91	1–1	–	–	–	Alumni Gym (450); Lawrenceville, NJ
December 3, 1977*		at Rider; Governor's Classic championship	W 80–79	2–1	–	–	–	Alumni Gym (400); Lawrenceville, NJ
December 6, 1977*		Long Island	W 78–76	3–1	–	–	–	Daskalakis Athletic Center (1,200); Philadelphia, PA
December 15, 1977*		University of Chicago	W 78–54	4–1	–	–	–	Daskalakis Athletic Center (650); Philadelphia, PA
December 17, 1977*		West Chester	L 77–81 ^{OT}	4–2	–	20 – Stephens	–	Daskalakis Athletic Center (500); Philadelphia, PA
December 19, 1977*		at St. Francis (NY)	L 78–86	4–3	–	–	–	(100)
December 28, 1977*		vs. Northeastern; Bentley Christmas semifinal	L 69–77	4–4	–	–	–	Dana Athletic Center; Waltham, MA
Unknown*		at Bentley; Bentley Christmas 3rd place	L 81–82	4–5	–	–	–	Dana Athletic Center; Waltham, MA
January 4, 1978		American	L 57–58	4–6 (0–1)	–	–	–	Daskalakis Athletic Center (1,500); Philadelphia, PA
January 7, 1978*		Rider	W 90–77	5–6	–	–	–	Daskalakis Athletic Center (500); Philadelphia, PA
January 11, 1978; 5:00 pm		La Salle	L 79–80	5–7 (0–2)	–	–	–	Palestra; Philadelphia, PA
January 14, 1978*		at Gettysburg	W 72–59	6–7	–	–	–	Bream Gym; Gettysburg, PA
January 16, 1978*		Bucknell	W 89–68	7–7	–	–	–	Daskalakis Athletic Center; Philadelphia, PA
January 18, 1978*		Lehigh	W 62–59	8–7	–	–	–	Daskalakis Athletic Center; Philadelphia, PA
January 28, 1978*		Northeastern	L 78–80 ^{2OT}	8–8	–	–	–	Daskalakis Athletic Center; Philadelphia, PA
February 1, 1978*		at Fairleigh Dickinson	L 54–62	8–9	–	–	–	(200)
February 4, 1978		Temple	L 70–88	8–10 (0–3)	–	–	–	Daskalakis Athletic Center (1,250); Philadelphia, PA
February 7, 1978		at Saint Joseph's	W 88–77	9–10 (1–3)	–	–	–	(419)
Unknown*		at Widener	L 54–62	9–11	–	–	–	(750)
Unknown*		Philadelphia Textile	W 58–45	10–11	–	–	–	Daskalakis Athletic Center (500); Philadelphia, PA
February 18, 1978*		at Catholic University	W 71–70	11–11	–	–	–	
February 20, 1978*		at Siena	L 115–126 ^{3OT}	11–12	–	–	–	(2,320)
February 22, 1978*		Wagner	W 109–77	12–12	–	–	–	Daskalakis Athletic Center (250); Philadelphia, PA
February 22, 1978		Hofstra	W 82–76	13–12 (2–3)	–	–	–	Daskalakis Athletic Center (1,000); Philadelphia, PA
ECC Tournament
February 27, 1978	(4 E)	(5 E) Saint Joseph's; First Round	L 80–90 ^{OT}	13–13	–	–	–	Daskalakis Athletic Center (1,000); Philadelphia, PA
*Non-conference game. ^{#}Rankings from AP. (#) Tournament seedings in parentheses. E=East. All times are in Eastern Time.

== Awards ==
Bob Stephens

- ECC All-Conference Second Team
- Governor's Classic Tournament MVP
- Governor's Classic All-Tournament Team
