= 1979–80 Drexel Dragons men's basketball team =

American college basketball season

1979–80 Drexel Dragons men's basketball
- Conference: East Coast Conference
- East
- Record: 12–15 (4–7 ECC)
- Head coach: Eddie Burke (3rd season)
- Home arena: Daskalakis Athletic Center

1979–80 ECC men's basketball standings
	Conf.				Overall
Team	W		L	PCT	W		L	PCT
East
Saint Joseph's	10	–	1	.909	21	–	9	.700
Temple	8	–	3	.727	14	–	12	.538
La Salle †	7	–	4	.636	22	–	9	.710
Hofstra	6	–	5	.545	14	–	14	.500
American	5	–	6	.455	13	–	14	.481
Drexel	4	–	7	.364	12	–	15	.444
West
Lafayette	13	–	3	.813	21	–	8	.724
Bucknell	13	–	3	.813	20	–	7	.741
Delaware	7	–	9	.438	9	–	19	.321
Rider	5	–	11	.313	10	–	18	.357
Lehigh	2	–	14	.125	5	–	20	.200
West Chester	1	–	15	.063	3	–	23	.115
† 1980 ECC tournament winner Rankings from AP poll

The 1979–80 Drexel Dragons men's basketball team represented Drexel University during the 1979–80 NCAA Division I men's basketball season. The Dragons, led by 3rd year head coach Eddie Burke, played their home games at the Daskalakis Athletic Center and were members of the East Coast Conference (ECC).

The team finished the season 12–15, and finished in 6th place in the ECC East in the regular season.

== Roster ==
1979–80 Drexel Dragons men's basketball team
Players
Coaches

Pos.	#	Name	Height	Weight	Year	Previous school	Hometown
		Len Hatzenbeller	6 ft 9 in (2.06 m)	—	Jr
			—	—

Head coach

- Eddie Burke (La Salle)

Assistant coach(es)

Legend

- (C) Team captain
- (S) Suspended
- (I) Ineligible
- (W) Walk-on
- Injured
- Current redshirt

== Schedule ==
Date time, TV	Rank^{#}	Opponent^{#}	Result	Record	High points	High rebounds	High assists	Site (attendance) city, state
Regular season
December 1, 1979		at Delaware	L 60–61	0–1 (0–1)	–	–	–	(764)
December 3, 1979*		Rutgers	L 60–69 ^{OT}	0–2	–	–	–	Rutgers Athletic Center (3,910); Piscataway, NJ
December 5, 1979*		Long Island	W 83–70	1–2	–	–	–	Daskalakis Athletic Center (525); Philadelphia, PA
December 15, 1979		West Chester	W 93–60	2–2 (1–1)	–	–	–	Daskalakis Athletic Center (380); Philadelphia, PA
December 17, 1979*		at St. Francis (NY)	W 83–67	3–2	–	–	–	(172)
December 28, 1979*		vs. Southern Illinois; UAB Classic semifinal	W 74–62	4–2	–	–	–	BJCC Arena (4,100); Birmingham, AL
December 29, 1979*		at UAB; UAB Classic championship	L 60–100	4–3	–	–	–	BJCC Arena (3,652); Birmingham, AL
January 2, 1980		at Lafayette	L 61–63	4–4 (1–2)	–	–	–	(1,500)
January 5, 1980*		vs. Wagner; Fairfield Boys Classic semifinals	L 76–100	4–5	–	–	–	Alumni Hall (2,200); Fairfield, CT
January 6, 1980*		at Fairfield; Fairfield Boys Classic 3rd place	L 62–65	4–6	–	–	–	Alumni Hall (2,000); Fairfield, CT
January 10, 1980		at Rider	W 85–69	5–6 (2–2)	–	–	–	(500)
January 12, 1980		at Saint Joseph's	L 60–71	5–7 (2–3)	–	–	–	Hagan Arena (1,045); Philadelphia, PA
January 14, 1980		Bucknell	L 64–73	5–8 (2–4)	–	–	–	Daskalakis Athletic Center (750); Philadelphia, PA
January 16, 1980		Lehigh	W 83–77	6–8 (3–4)	–	–	–	Daskalakis Athletic Center (900); Philadelphia, PA
January 19, 1980*		Northeastern	W 76–73	7–8	–	–	–	Daskalakis Athletic Center (500); Philadelphia, PA
January 21, 1980*		US International	W 78–71	8–8	–	–	–	Daskalakis Athletic Center (300); Philadelphia, PA
January 23, 1980; 7:00 pm		at La Salle	L 61–65	8–9 (3–5)	–	–	–	Palestra (3,800); Philadelphia, PA
January 25, 1980		Hofstra	L 71–79	8–10 (3–6)	–	–	–	Daskalakis Athletic Center (550); Philadelphia, PA
January 30, 1980*		at Fairleigh Dickinson	W 73–72	9–10	–	–	–	(732)
February 2, 1980		Temple	W 60–59	10–10 (4–6)	–	–	–	Daskalakis Athletic Center (1,700); Philadelphia, PA
February 4, 1980*		at Villanova	L 76–94	10–11	36 – Hatzenbeller	–	–	(2,800)
February 9, 1980*		at Catholic University	W 92–88	11–11	36 – Hatzenbeller	–	–	Brookland Stadium (2,100); Washington, D.C.
February 13, 1980*		at Dayton	L 67–79	11–12	–	–	–	(9,509)
February 16, 1980		American	L 78–83	11–13 (4–7)	–	–	–	Daskalakis Athletic Center (1,500); Philadelphia, PA
February 20, 1980*		at West Virginia	L 62–89	11–14	–	–	–	WVU Coliseum (4,601); Morgantown, WV
February 23, 1980*		Wagner	W 68–66	12–14	–	–	–	Daskalakis Athletic Center (1,500); Philadelphia, PA
ECC Tournament
February 25, 1980	(6 E)	at (3 E) La Salle; First round	L 76–87	12–15	–	–	–	Palestra (1,000); Philadelphia, PA
*Non-conference game. ^{#}Rankings from AP. (#) Tournament seedings in parentheses. E=East. All times are in Eastern Time.

== Awards ==
Dave Broadus

- ECC All-Conference Second Team
