= 1977–78 La Salle Explorers men's basketball team =

American college basketball season

1977–78 La Salle Explorers men's basketball

ECC tournament champion

NCAA Division I tournament, First round
- Conference: East Coast Conference
- Record: 18–12 (7–0 ECC)
- Head coach: Paul Westhead (8th season)
- Home arena: The Palestra

1977–78 ECC men's basketball standings
	Conf.				Overall
Team	W		L	PCT	W		L	PCT
East
La Salle †	5	–	0	1.000	18	–	12	.600
Temple	4	–	1	.800	24	–	4	.857
American	2	–	3	.400	16	–	12	.571
Drexel	2	–	3	.400	13	–	15	.464
Saint Joseph's	2	–	3	.400	13	–	15	.464
Hofstra	0	–	5	.000	8	–	19	.296
West
Lafayette	10	–	0	1.000	23	–	8	.742
Delaware	5	–	5	.500	16	–	11	.593
Bucknell	5	–	5	.500	13	–	15	.464
Lehigh	5	–	5	.500	8	–	18	.308
Rider	4	–	6	.400	11	–	16	.407
West Chester	2	–	8	.200	6	–	19	.240
† 1978 ECC tournament winner Rankings from AP Poll

The 1977–78 La Salle Explorers men's basketball team represented La Salle University as a member of the East Coast Conference during the 1977–78 NCAA Division I men's basketball season. The team was led by head coach Paul Westhead and played their home games at The Palestra in Philadelphia, Pennsylvania. After finishing atop the ECC East division standings, the Explorers won the ECC tournament to receive a bid to the NCAA tournament. As the No. 4 at-large seed in the East region, La Salle lost to the No. 2 qualifying seed Villanova in the opening round. The team finished with a record of 18–12 (7–0 ECC).

== Roster ==
1977–78 La Salle Explorers men's basketball team
Players
Coaches

Pos.	#	Name	Height	Weight	Year	Previous school	Hometown
F	32	Michael Brooks	6 ft 7 in (2.01 m)	—	So		Philadelphia, Pennsylvania
		Tony DiLeo	6 ft 1 in (1.85 m)	—	Sr	Cinnaminson
G		Darryl Gladden	6 ft 1 in (1.85 m)	—	So
G		Kurt Kanaskie	6 ft 2 in (1.88 m)	—	So	Cumberland Valley	Mechanicsburg, Pennsylvania
G		Kevin Lynam	6 ft 2 in (1.88 m)	—	Fr
F		Greg Metzinger	6 ft 5 in (1.96 m)	—	Sr
G		Joe Mihalich	6 ft 0 in (1.83 m)	—	Sr
F		Reggie Miller	6 ft 5 in (1.96 m)	—	So
F		James Mo Connolly	6 ft 7 in (2.01 m)	—	So
		Tony Plakis	6 ft 4 in (1.93 m)	—	Jr
F		Mark Spain	6 ft 7 in (2.01 m)	—	So
G		Greg Webster	6 ft 1 in (1.85 m)	—	Fr
F		Stanley Williams	6 ft 8 in (2.03 m)	—	Fr
F		Jim Wolkiewicz	6 ft 6 in (1.98 m)	—	Sr

Head coach

- Paul Westhead

Assistant coach(es)

Legend

- (C) Team captain
- (S) Suspended
- (I) Ineligible
- (W) Walk-on
- Injured
- Current redshirt

Roster

== Schedule and results ==
Date time, TV	Rank^{#}	Opponent^{#}	Result	Record	Site city, state
Regular season
Nov 25, 1977*		at Widener	W 83–75	1–0	Pride Recreation Center; Chester, Pennsylvania
Nov 30, 1977*		at Bucknell	W 92–77	2–0	Davis Gym; Lewisburg, Pennsylvania
Dec 7, 1977*		Rhode Island	L 73–78	2–1	The Palestra; Philadelphia, Pennsylvania
Dec 9, 1977*		vs. East Carolina; First Union Invitational	W 96–95 ^{2OT}	3–1	Charlotte Coliseum; Charlotte, North Carolina
Dec 10, 1977*		at UNC Charlotte; First Union Invitational	L 67–68	3–2	Charlotte Coliseum; Charlotte, North Carolina
Dec 17, 1977*		Penn	L 75–78	3–3	The Palestra; Philadelphia, Pennsylvania
Dec 28, 1977*		at No. 7 Louisville; Louisville Classic	L 85–113	3–4	Freedom Hall; Louisville, Kentucky
Dec 29, 1977*		vs. Ohio State; Louisville Classic	L 83–86	3–5	Freedom Hall; Louisville, Kentucky
Jan 4, 1978*		at Western Kentucky	W 78–64	4–5	E. A. Diddle Arena; Bowling Green, KY
Jan 6, 1978*		at Niagara	W 116–97	5–5	Niagara Falls Convention and Civic Center; Niagara Falls, New York
Jan 9, 1978		at Hofstra	W 97–87	6–5 (1–0)	Hofstra Physical Fitness Center; Hempstead, New York
Jan 11, 1978*; 5:00 p.m.		Drexel	W 80–79	7–5 (2–0)	The Palestra; Philadelphia, Pennsylvania
Jan 14, 1978*		at Duquesne	W 79–74	8–5	Civic Arena; Pittsburgh, Pennsylvania
Jan 16, 1978*		West Chester	W 116–84	9–5	Hollinger Field House; West Chester, Pennsylvania
Jan 19, 1978*		at No. 11 Syracuse	L 96–106	9–6	Manley Field House; Syracuse, New York
Jan 21, 1978*		No. 17 Duke	L 81–91	9–7	Spectrum; Philadelphia, Pennsylvania
Jan 24, 1978*		at Biscayne	W 89–84	10–7	Fernandez Family Center; Miami Gardens, Florida
Jan 28, 1978		Temple	W 82–75	11–7 (3–0)	The Palestra; Philadelphia, Pennsylvania
Feb 1, 1978*		No. 4 Notre Dame	L 90–95	11–8	The Palestra; Philadelphia, Pennsylvania
Feb 4, 1978		Saint Joseph's	W 82–74	12–8 (4–0)	The Palestra; Philadelphia, Pennsylvania
Feb 8, 1978		American	W 64–62	13–8 (5–0)	The Palestra; Philadelphia, Pennsylvania
Feb 11, 1978*		at Canisius	L 77–78	13–9	Buffalo Memorial Auditorium; Buffalo, New York
Feb 15, 1978*		Stetson	W 77–72	14–9	The Palestra; Philadelphia, Pennsylvania
Feb 18, 1978*		Villanova	L 79–82	14–10	The Palestra; Philadelphia, Pennsylvania
Feb 22, 1978*		at St. Bonaventure	L 95–108	14–11	Reilly Center; St. Bonaventure, New York
Feb 25, 1978*		at Vermont	W 100–67	15–11	Patrick Gym; Burlington, Vermont
ECC Tournament
Mar 2, 1978*	(1E)	(5E) Saint Joseph's; Quarterfinals	W 89–82	16–11	Tom Gola Arena; Philadelphia, Pennsylvania
Mar 3, 1978*	(1E)	vs. (2W) Delaware; Semifinals	W 97–85	17–11	Allan P. Kirby Field House; Easton, Pennsylvania
Mar 4, 1978*	(1E)	vs. (2E) Temple; Championship game	W 73–72	18–11	Allan P. Kirby Field House; Easton, Pennsylvania
NCAA Tournament
Mar 12, 1978*	(E 4L)	vs. (E 2Q) Villanova; First round	L 97–103	18–12	The Palestra; Philadelphia, Pennsylvania
*Non-conference game. ^{#}Rankings from AP poll. (#) Tournament seedings in parentheses. E=East. All times are in Eastern Standard Time.
