= 1977–78 American Eagles men's basketball team =

American college basketball season

1977–78 American Eagles men's basketball
- Conference: East Coast Conference
- Record: 16–10 (8–6 EEC)
- Head coach: Jim Lynam (5th season)
- Home arena: Fort Myer Ceremony Hall

1977–78 ECC men's basketball standings
	Conf.				Overall
Team	W		L	PCT	W		L	PCT
East
La Salle †	5	–	0	1.000	18	–	12	.600
Temple	4	–	1	.800	24	–	4	.857
American	2	–	3	.400	16	–	12	.571
Drexel	2	–	3	.400	13	–	15	.464
Saint Joseph's	2	–	3	.400	13	–	15	.464
Hofstra	0	–	5	.000	8	–	19	.296
West
Lafayette	10	–	0	1.000	23	–	8	.742
Delaware	5	–	5	.500	16	–	11	.593
Bucknell	5	–	5	.500	13	–	15	.464
Lehigh	5	–	5	.500	8	–	18	.308
Rider	4	–	6	.400	11	–	16	.407
West Chester	2	–	8	.200	6	–	19	.240
† 1978 ECC tournament winner Rankings from AP Poll

The 1977–78 American Eagles men's basketball team represented American University during the 1977–78 NCAA Division I men's basketball season.

== Roster ==
1977–78 American Eagles men's basketball team
Players
Coaches

Pos.	#	Name	Height	Weight	Year	Hometown
G	25	Mike Abner	6 ft 4 in (1.93 m)	175 lb (79 kg)	So	Chester, Pennsylvania
G	13	Rodney Adams	5 ft 11 in (1.8 m)	170 lb (77 kg)	Jr	Oxon Hill, Maryland
F	20	Russell Bowers	6 ft 5 in (1.96 m)	203 lb (92 kg)	Fr	Westfield, New Jersey
C	31	Howie Lassoff	6 ft 10 in (2.08 m)	228 lb (103 kg)	Sr	Overbrook, Philadelphia
G	23	Stan Lamb	6 ft 2 in (1.88 m)	200 lb (91 kg)	So	Bronx, New York
G	14	Mark Garlitos	6 ft 0 in (1.83 m)	170 lb (77 kg)	Jr	Haddonfield, New Jersey
F	24	Leon Kearney	6 ft 5 in (1.96 m)	205 lb (93 kg)	So	Plainfield, New Jersey
G	10	Donald Kelly	5 ft 10 in (1.78 m)	160 lb (73 kg)	Sr	Philadelphia, Pennsylvania
F	30	Joe Mitchell	6 ft 8 in (2.03 m)	215 lb (98 kg)	So	Cherry Hill, New Jersey
C	32	Tom Pfotzer	6 ft 10 in (2.08 m)	225 lb (102 kg)	So	Wilmington, Delaware
G	22	Ray Voelkel	6 ft 5 in (1.96 m)	205 lb (93 kg)	Jr	Bronx, New York

Head coach

- Jim Lynam

Assistant coach(es)

Legend

- (C) Team captain
- (S) Suspended
- (I) Ineligible
- (W) Walk-on
- Injured
- Current redshirt

Roster

== Schedule ==
Date time, TV	Rank^{#}	Opponent^{#}	Result	Record	Site city, state
Regular season
Nov 27, 1977*		vs. No. 14 Maryland; D.C. Tip-off Tournament	L 65–78	0–1	Capital Centre; Landover, Maryland
Nov 28, 1977*		vs. Navy; D.C. Tip-off Tournament	L 45–60	0–2	Capital Centre; Landover, Maryland
Nov 30, 1977*		Catholic	W 73–72	1–2	Fort Myer Ceremony Hall; Washington, D.C.
Dec 2, 1977*		vs. Northeastern; James Madison Invitational	L 68–72	1–3	Godwin Hall; Harrisonburg, Virginia
Dec 3, 1977*		vs. Siena; James Madison Invitational	W 80–79	2–3	Godwin Hall; Harrisonburg, Virginia
Dec 5, 1977*		Washington College	W 99–76	3–3	Fort Myer Ceremony Hall; Washington, D.C.
Dec 7, 1977*		at Clemson	L 58–98	3–4	Littlejohn Coliseum; Clemson, South Carolina
Dec 10, 1977*		Delaware	W 73–61	4–4	Fort Myer Ceremony Hall; Washington, D.C.
Dec 14, 1977*		No. 12 Syracuse	L 67–85	4–5	Fort Myer Ceremony Hall; Washington, D.C.
Dec 17, 1977*		Rider	W 78–71	5–5	Fort Myer Ceremony Hall; Washington, D.C.
Dec 22, 1977*		St. Mary's (MD)	W 80–62	6–5	Fort Myer Ceremony Hall; Washington, D.C.
Jan 4, 1978		at Drexel	W 58–57	7–5 (1–0)	Daskalakis Athletic Center (1,500); Philadelphia, Pennsylvania
Jan 7, 1978*		vs. Wagner; Boys Club Classic	W 99–83	8–5	Alumni Hall; Fairfield, Connecticut
Jan 8, 1978*		at Fairfield; Boys Club Classic	L 88–105	8–6	Alumni Hall; Fairfield, Connecticut
Jan 11, 1978*		Lafayette	L 64–76	8–7	Fort Myer Ceremony Hall; Washington, D.C.
Jan 14, 1978*		at Bucknell	W 87–75	9–7	Davis Gym; Lewisburg, Pennsylvania
Jan 18, 1978*		West Chester State	W 67–59	10–7	Fort Myer Ceremony Hall; Washington, D.C.
Jan 21, 1978*		at William & Mary	W 73–67	11–7	William & Mary Hall; Williamsburg, Virginia
Jan 25, 1978*		at No. 16 Georgetown	L 68–72	11–8	McDonough Gymnasium (3,532); Washington, D.C.
Jan 28, 1978*		at Richmond	W 77–62	12–8	Robins Center; Richmond, Virginia
Feb 1, 1978		Saint Joseph's	L 48–74	12–9 (1–1)	Fort Myer Ceremony Hall; Washington, D.C.
Feb 8, 1978		at La Salle	L 62–64	12–10 (1–2)	The Palestra; Philadelphia, Pennsylvania
Feb 11, 1978		Hofstra	W 78–73	13–10 (2–2)	Fort Myer Ceremony Hall; Washington, D.C.
Feb 15, 1978*		Navy	W 73–66	14–10	Fort Myer Ceremony Hall; Washington, D.C.
Feb 18, 1978		Temple	L 67–72	14–11 (2–3)	Fort Myer Ceremony Hall; Washington, D.C.
Feb 25, 1978*		George Washington	W 82–78	15–11	Fort Myer Ceremony Hall; Washington, D.C.
ECC Tournament
Feb 27, 1978*	(3E)	(6E) Hofstra; First round	W 97–77	16–11	Fort Myer Ceremony Hall; Washington, D.C.
Mar 1, 1978	(3E)	at (2E) Temple; Quarterfinals	L 80–99	16–12	McGonigle Hall; Philadelphia, Pennsylvania
*Non-conference game. ^{#}Rankings from AP poll. (#) Tournament seedings in parentheses. All times are in Eastern Time.
