= 1978–79 Drexel Dragons men's basketball team =

American college basketball season

1978–79 Drexel Dragons men's basketball

Lafayette College Invitational Tournament champions
- Conference: East Coast Conference
- East
- Record: 18–9 (6–5 ECC)
- Head coach: Eddie Burke (2nd season)
- Home arena: Daskalakis Athletic Center

1978–79 ECC men's basketball standings
	Conf.				Overall
Team	W		L	PCT	W		L	PCT
East
Temple †	10	–	0	1.000	25	–	4	.862
Saint Joseph's	9	–	2	.818	19	–	11	.633
La Salle	9	–	2	.818	15	–	13	.536
American	7	–	4	.636	14	–	13	.519
Drexel	6	–	5	.545	18	–	9	.667
Hofstra	3	–	8	.273	8	–	19	.296
West
Bucknell	11	–	5	.688	18	–	9	.667
Lafayette	8	–	8	.500	16	–	12	.571
Rider	7	–	8	.467	11	–	15	.423
West Chester	4	–	12	.250	8	–	18	.308
Lehigh	4	–	12	.250	8	–	18	.308
Delaware	2	–	12	.143	5	–	22	.185
† 1979 ECC tournament winner Rankings from AP Poll

The 1978–79 Drexel Dragons men's basketball team represented Drexel University during the 1978–79 men's basketball season. The Dragons, led by 2nd year head coach Eddie Burke, played their home games at the Daskalakis Athletic Center and were members of the East Coast Conference (ECC).

The team finished the season 18–9, and finished in 5th place in the ECC East in the regular season.

== Roster ==
1978–79 Drexel Dragons men's basketball team
Players
Coaches

Pos.	#	Name	Height	Weight	Year	Previous school	Hometown
F		Bob Stephens	6 ft 8 in (2.03 m)	—
		Dave Broadus	6 ft 6 in (1.98 m)	—	Jr
PG		Brian O'Loughlin	6 ft 0 in (1.83 m)	—
		Len Hatzenbeller	6 ft 9 in (2.06 m)	—	So
		Randy Burkert	6 ft 5 in (1.96 m)	—	Fr
		Joe Boback	6 ft 5 in (1.96 m)	—	Sr
G		Norm Buchannon	6 ft 4 in (1.93 m)	—

Head coach

- Eddie Burke (La Salle)

Assistant coach(es)

Legend

- (C) Team captain
- (S) Suspended
- (I) Ineligible
- (W) Walk-on
- Injured
- Current redshirt

== Schedule ==
Date time, TV	Rank^{#}	Opponent^{#}	Result	Record	High points	High rebounds	High assists	Site (attendance) city, state
Regular season
Unknown*		Widener	W 45–33	1–0	–	–	–	Daskalakis Athletic Center (1,000); Philadelphia, PA
December 2, 1978		Delaware	W 68–55	2–0 (1–0)	–	–	–	Daskalakis Athletic Center (500); Philadelphia, PA
December 5, 1978*		vs. Long Island; Wisconsin Invitational	W 74–68	3–0	–	–	–	(700); Madison, WI
December 16, 1978*		at Colorado State	W 75–73	4–0	–	–	–	(5,976)
December 18, 1978*		at Denver	W 74–72	5–0	–	–	–	(226)
Unknown*		vs. Florida Southern; Lafayette Tournament semifinal	W 78–66	6–0	–	–	–	Kirby Field House (1,500); Easton, PA
December 28, 1978*		at Lafayette; Lafayette Tournament championship	W 69–61	7–0	–	–	–	Kirby Field House (2,200); Easton, PA
January 6, 1979		Rider	W 64–52	8–0 (4–0)	–	–	–	Daskalakis Athletic Center (750); Philadelphia, PA
January 8, 1979		Lafayette	W 70–58	9–0 (3–0)	–	–	–	Daskalakis Athletic Center (1,500); Philadelphia, PA
January 10, 1979		at West Chester	W 77–61	10–0 (4–0)	–	–	–	(250)
January 15, 1979		at Bucknell	L 66–67	10–1 (4–1)	–	–	–	Davis Gym (1,750); Lewisburg, PA
January 17, 1979		at Lehigh	W 69–62	11–1 (5–1)	–	–	–	(750)
January 20, 1979*		at Northeastern	W 81–73	12–1	–	–	–	(1,268)
January 24, 1979		at American	L 76–94	12–2 (5–2)	–	–	–	(500)
January 27, 1979; 2:15 pm		La Salle	L 74–88	12–3 (5–3)	–	–	–	Daskalakis Athletic Center (1,800); Philadelphia, PA
January 31, 1979*		Fairleigh Dickinson	W 69–57	13–3	–	–	–	Daskalakis Athletic Center (500); Philadelphia, PA
February 3, 1979		vs. No. 18 Temple	L 73–95	13–4 (5–4)	–	–	–	Palestra (6,491); Philadelphia, PA
February 6, 1979		Saint Joseph's	L 52–62	13–5 (5–5)	–	–	–	Daskalakis Athletic Center (1,500); Philadelphia, PA
February 8, 1979*		at Rutgers	L 61–87	13–6	–	–	–	Louis Brown Athletic Center (4,725); Piscataway, NJ
February 12, 1979		at Hofstra	W 73–68	14–6 (6–5)	–	–	–	(765)
Unknown*		at Philadelphia Textile	W 58–57	15–6	–	–	–	(1,000)
February 17, 1979*		Catholic University	W 94–75	16–6	22 – Broadus	13 – Stephens	7 – O'Loughlin	Daskalakis Athletic Center (517); Philadelphia, PA
February 20, 1979*		at Wagner	L 75–90	16–7	–	–	–	(1,750)
February 22, 1979*		at UAB	L 60–77	16–8	–	–	–	BJCC Arena (5,195); Birmingham, AL
February 24, 1979*		St. Francis (NY)	W 89–80 ^{OT}	17–8	36 – Stephens	21 – Stephens	–	Daskalakis Athletic Center (250); Philadelphia, PA
ECC Tournament
February 26, 1979	(5 E)	at (4 E) American	W 66–55	18–8	–	–	–	Fort Myer Ceremonial Hall (500); Arlington, VA
February 28, 1979	(5 E)	at (1 E) No. 12 Temple	L 57–61	18–9	–	–	–	Palestra (1,900); Philadelphia, PA
*Non-conference game. ^{#}Rankings from AP. (#) Tournament seedings in parentheses. E=East. All times are in Eastern Time.

== Awards ==
Randy Burkert

- ECC Rookie of the Year

Bob Stephens

- ECC All-Conference First Team
- ECC Player of the Week (4)
- Lafayette College Invitational Tournament MVP
- Lafayette College Invitational All-Tournament Team
