= 1984–85 Drexel Dragons men's basketball team =

American college basketball season

1984–85 Drexel Dragons men's basketball
- Conference: East Coast Conference
- Record: 10–18 (8–6 ECC)
- Head coach: Eddie Burke (8th season)
- Assistant coach: Pat Flannery (2nd season)
- MVP: Michael Anderson
- Captain: Walton Fuller
- Home arena: Daskalakis Athletic Center

1984–85 ECC men's basketball standings
	Conf.				Overall
Team	W		L	PCT	W		L	PCT
Bucknell	10	–	4	.714	19	–	10	.655
Lafayette	8	–	6	.571	15	–	13	.536
Drexel	8	–	6	.571	10	–	18	.357
Rider	7	–	7	.500	14	–	15	.483
Delaware	7	–	7	.500	12	–	16	.429
Lehigh †	6	–	8	.429	12	–	19	.387
Hofstra	5	–	9	.357	14	–	15	.483
Towson State	5	–	9	.357	7	–	21	.250
† 1985 ECC tournament winner Rankings from AP poll

The 1984–85 Drexel Dragons men's basketball team represented Drexel University during the 1984–85 NCAA Division I men's basketball season. The Dragons, led by 8th year head coach Eddie Burke, played their home games at the Daskalakis Athletic Center and were members of the East Coast Conference (ECC).

The team finished the season 10–18, and finished in 2nd place in the ECC in the regular season.

In the 1984–85 season, freshman guard Michael Anderson set the school records at the time for points in a season by a freshman (393), assists in a season (137), seals in a season (84), and assists in a game by a freshman (11, vs Delaware on February 2). He also tied the team record for free throws made and in attempted in a game (18 and 23 respectively, vs Northwestern Louisiana).

== Roster ==
1984–85 Drexel Dragons men's basketball team
Players
Coaches

Pos.	#	Name	Height	Weight	Year	Previous school	Hometown
G	10	Michael Anderson	5 ft 11 in (1.8 m)	—	Fr	Carver HS	Philadelphia, PA
G	22	Walton Fuller (C)	6 ft 2 in (1.88 m)	—	Jr	Monsignor Bonner HS	Philadelphia, PA
G		Chris O'Brien	6 ft 0 in (1.83 m)	—	Jr
F		Casper Cooper	6 ft 4 in (1.93 m)	—	So
G	11	Troy Stribling	6 ft 0 in (1.83 m)	—	So
G		Tom Pedersen	6 ft 3 in (1.91 m)	—	So
F		Pat Rafferty	6 ft 6 in (1.98 m)	—	So
F		Rick Papes	6 ft 6 in (1.98 m)	—	So
F		Gerald Gardner	6 ft 4 in (1.93 m)	—	Fr
F		Doug Johnston	6 ft 5 in (1.96 m)	—	Fr
C		Charles Hickman (I)	—	—	Jr

Head coach

- Eddie Burke (La Salle)

Assistant coach(es)

- Pat Flannery (Bucknell)

Legend

- (C) Team captain
- (S) Suspended
- (I) Ineligible
- (W) Walk-on
- Injured
- Current redshirt

- Junior Center Charles Hickman left the team during the season for academic reasons

== Schedule ==
Date time, TV	Rank^{#}	Opponent^{#}	Result	Record	High points	High rebounds	High assists	Site (attendance) city, state
Exhibition
November 9, 1984; 7:00 pm		Concordia of Canada						Daskalakis Athletic Center; Philadelphia, PA
Regular season
November 24, 1984*; 7:00 pm		at Temple	L 62–75	0–1	19 – Anderson	6 – Anderson	9 – Anderson	McGonigle Hall (4,003); Philadelphia, PA
November 29, 1984*		at Navy	L 74–91	0–2	15 – O'Brien	6 – Hickman	6 – Fuller	Halsey Field House (1,650); Annapolis, MD
December 1, 1984*		at William & Mary	L 65–81	0–3	19 – Fuller	8 – Fuller	–	Kaplan Arena (2,050); Williamsburg, VA
December 4, 1984*		East Carolina	W 80–73	1–3	25 – Hickman	8 – Anderson	–	Daskalakis Athletic Center (1,800); Philadelphia, PA
December 14, 1984*		at Southwestern Louisiana; Ragin' Cajuns' Bayou Classic semifinal	L 52–71	1–4	15 – Anderson	7 – Cooper	–	Blackham Coliseum (6,257); Lafayette, LA
December 15, 1984*		vs. Northwestern State (LA); Ragin' Cajuns' Bayou Classic 3rd place game	W 92–82	2–4	20 – Anderson	5 – Tied	–	Blackham Coliseum (7,808); Lafayette, LA
December 17, 1984*		at Tulsa	L 62–86	2–5	16 – Hickman	7 – Anderson	–	Tulsa Convention Center (8,204); Tulsa, OK
December 20, 1984*		at Richmond	L 52–85	2–6	14 – Tied	7 – Hickman	–	Robins Center (3,148); Richmond, VA
December 28, 1984*		vs. Hofstra; Orange Bowl Classic semifinal	L 71–85	2–7 (0–1)	18 – Hickman	9 – Hickman	–	Knight Center Complex (1,000); Miami, FL
December 29, 1984*		vs. Boston University; Orange Bowl Classic 3rd place game	L 59–62	2–8	25 – Hickman	10 – Hickman	–	Knight Center Complex (1,000); Miami, FL
January 2, 1985		at Delaware	W 89–75	3–8 (1–1)	31 – Hickman	6 – Cooper	–	Delaware Field House (964); Newark, DE
January 7, 1985; 7:00 pm		Lafayette	L 55–58	3–9 (1–2)	14 – O'Brien	10 – Cooper	–	Daskalakis Athletic Center (1,200); Philadelphia, PA
January 9, 1985		Towson State	W 93–76	4–9 (2–2)	17 – Anderson	7 – Cooper	–	Daskalakis Athletic Center (1,050); Philadelphia, PA
January 16, 1985; 7:00 pm		Rider	L 74–76 ^{OT}	4–10 (2–3)	22 – Anderson	7 – Tied	–	Daskalakis Athletic Center (1,234); Philadelphia, PA
January 19, 1985		at Bucknell	W 62–60	5–10 (3–3)	15 – Anderson	11 – Cooper	–	Davis Gym (1,650); Lewisburg, PA
January 21, 1984*; 8:00 pm		vs. No. 14 Villanova	L 55–63	5–11	22 – Anderson	8 – Anderson	–	Palestra (4,108); Philadelphia, PA
January 25, 1985; 7:00 pm		Lehigh	L 72–73	5–12 (3–4)	21 – Anderson	9 – Cooper	–	Daskalakis Athletic Center (1,042); Philadelphia, PA
January 28, 1985*; 8:30 pm		Saint Peter's	L 57–75	5–13	16 – Anderson	8 – Cooper	–	Daskalakis Athletic Center (1,020); Philadelphia, PA
January 30, 1985		at Lafayette	L 59–69	5–14 (3–5)	18 – Cooper	9 – Cooper	–	Kirby Sports Center (1,235); Easton, PA
February 2, 1985; 2:00 pm		Delaware	W 73–67	6–14 (4–5)	22 – Fuller	9 – Anderson	11 – Anderson	Daskalakis Athletic Center (1,240); Philadelphia, PA
February 4, 1985*; 7:00 pm		Loyola (MD)	L 71–93	6–15	24 – Anderson	8 – Anderson	–	Daskalakis Athletic Center (1,100); Philadelphia, PA
February 9, 1985		at Towson State	W 64–61	7–15 (5–5)	14 – O'Brien	8 – Cooper	8 – Anderson	Towson Center (863); Towson, MD
February 11, 1985; 7:00 pm		Hofstra	W 78–66	8–15 (6–5)	20 – O'Brien	10 – Cooper	–	Daskalakis Athletic Center (865); Philadelphia, PA
February 16, 1985		at Rider	W 54–53	9–15 (7–5)	14 – Fuller	12 – Cooper	–	Alumni Gym (1,750); Lawrenceville, NJ
February 20, 1985; 7:00 pm		Bucknell	L 57–67	9–16 (7–6)	13 – Stribling	14 – Cooper	–	Daskalakis Athletic Center (1,175); Philadelphia, PA
February 23, 1985*		at Niagara	L 67–73	9–17	16 – O'Brien	9 – Tied	5 – Anderson	Buffalo Memorial Auditorium (600); Buffalo, NY
February 27, 1985		at Lehigh	W 70–69	10–17 (8–6)	23 – Anderson	6 – Cooper	4 – Anderson	Stabler Arena (600); Bethlehem, PA
ECC Tournament
March 2, 1985; 9:00 pm	(3)	vs. (6) Lehigh	L 56–58	10–18	14 – Fuller	8 – Cooper	–	Towson Center (917); Towson, MD
*Non-conference game. ^{#}Rankings from AP. (#) Tournament seedings in parentheses. All times are in Eastern Time.

== Awards ==
Michael Anderson

- ECC All–Conference Second Team
- ECC All–Rookie Team
- Basketball Times All-Freshman team honorable mention
- Ragin' Cajuns' Budweiser Bayou Classic All-Tournament team

Charles Hickman

- Orange Bowl Classic All-Tournament team
