= 1978–79 Temple Owls men's basketball team =

American college basketball season

1978–79 Temple Owls men's basketball

ECC Regular season champions ECC tournament champions

NCAA tournament, First round
- Conference: East Coast Conference

Ranking
- Coaches: No. 16
- Record: 25–4 (10–0 ECC)
- Head coach: Don Casey (6th season)
- Home arena: McGonigle Hall

1978–79 ECC men's basketball standings
	Conf.				Overall
Team	W		L	PCT	W		L	PCT
East
Temple †	10	–	0	1.000	25	–	4	.862
Saint Joseph's	9	–	2	.818	19	–	11	.633
La Salle	9	–	2	.818	15	–	13	.536
American	7	–	4	.636	14	–	13	.519
Drexel	6	–	5	.545	18	–	9	.667
Hofstra	3	–	8	.273	8	–	19	.296
West
Bucknell	11	–	5	.688	18	–	9	.667
Lafayette	8	–	8	.500	16	–	12	.571
Rider	7	–	8	.467	11	–	15	.423
West Chester	4	–	12	.250	8	–	18	.308
Lehigh	4	–	12	.250	8	–	18	.308
Delaware	2	–	12	.143	5	–	22	.185
† 1979 ECC tournament winner Rankings from AP Poll

The 1978–79 Temple Owls men's basketball team represented Temple University as a member of the East Coast Conference during the 1978–79 NCAA Division I men's basketball season.

== Roster ==
1978–79 Temple Owls men's basketball team
Players
Coaches

Pos.	#	Name	Height	Weight	Year	Previous school	Hometown
G		Ricky Reed	6 ft 0 in (1.83 m)	—	Sr
G		Keith Parham	6 ft 3 in (1.91 m)	—	So
F		Butch Harrold	6 ft 5 in (1.96 m)	—	Sr
F		Neal Robinson	6 ft 6 in (1.98 m)	—	So
C		Walt Montford	6 ft 6 in (1.98 m)	—	Sr

Head coach

- Don Casey

Assistant coach(es)

Legend

- (C) Team captain
- (S) Suspended
- (I) Ineligible
- (W) Walk-on
- Injured
- Current redshirt

Roster

== Schedule ==
Date time, TV	Rank^{#}	Opponent^{#}	Result	Record	Site city, state
Regular season
Nov 27, 1978*		at West Chester	W 78–60	1–0	Hollinger Field House; West Chester, Pennsylvania
Dec 3, 1978*		Lehigh	W 94–80	2–0	McGonigle Hall; Philadelphia, Pennsylvania
Dec 9, 1978*		at Wake Forest	W 86–79	3–0	Winston-Salem Memorial Coliseum; Winston-Salem, North Carolina
Dec 12, 1978*		Navy	W 73–47	4–0	The Palestra; Philadelphia, Pennsylvania
Dec 16, 1978*		vs. Villanova	W 66–58	5–0	The Palestra; Philadelphia, Pennsylvania
Dec 20, 1978*		at Manhattan	W 73–69	6–0	Alumni Hall; New York, New York
Dec 29, 1978*		vs. Baylor	W 81–70	7–0	Las Vegas Convention Center; Las Vegas, Nevada
Dec 30, 1978*		at No. 14 Nevada-Las Vegas	W 89–79	8–0	Las Vegas Convention Center; Las Vegas, Nevada
Jan 3, 1979*		Pittsburgh	W 62–57	9–0	The Palestra; Philadelphia, Pennsylvania
Jan 6, 1979*		at St. John's	W 74–73	10–0	Alumni Hall; New York, New York
Jan 10, 1979*	No. 18	vs. Penn	L 74–79	10–1	The Palestra; Philadelphia, Pennsylvania
Jan 24, 1979*		No. 12 Syracuse	L 76–78	14–2	The Palestra; Philadelphia, Pennsylvania
Jan 27, 1979*		at St. Francis (NY)	W 65–63	15–2	Generoso Pope Athletic Complex; Brooklyn, New York
Jan 29, 1979*		at Virginia	L 71–73	15–3	University Hall; Charlottesville, Virginia
Feb 1, 1979*		Hofstra	W 92–70	16–3	McGonigle Hall; Philadelphia, Pennsylvania
Feb 3, 1979*		vs. Drexel	W 95–73	17–3	The Palestra; Philadelphia, Pennsylvania
Feb 7, 1979*		Penn State	W 54–43	18–3	McGonigle Hall; Philadelphia, Pennsylvania
Feb 10, 1979*		vs. La Salle	W 97–81	19–3	The Palestra; Philadelphia, Pennsylvania
Feb 16, 1979*		American	W 103–67	20–3	McGonigle Hall; Philadelphia, Pennsylvania
Feb 21, 1979*		vs. Saint Joseph's	W 76–68	21–3	The Palestra; Philadelphia, Pennsylvania
Feb 24, 1979*		Dayton	W 66–63	22–3	The Palestra; Philadelphia, Pennsylvania
ECC Tournament
Feb 28, 1979*	No. 12	vs. Drexel; Quarterfinals	W 61–57	23–3	The Palestra; Philadelphia, Pennsylvania
Mar 2, 1979*	No. 12	Lafayette; Semifinals	W 53–50	24–3	The Palestra; Philadelphia, Pennsylvania
Mar 3, 1979*	No. 12	vs. Saint Joseph's; Championship game	W 61–60	25–3	The Palestra; Philadelphia, Pennsylvania
NCAA Tournament
Mar 9, 1979*	(7 E)	vs. (10 E) St. John's; First round	L 70–75	25–4	Reynolds Coliseum; Raleigh, North Carolina
*Non-conference game. ^{#}Rankings from AP Poll. (#) Tournament seedings in parentheses. E=East. All times are in Eastern Standard Time.
