= Lefty Ervin =

American basketball coach

Playing career

Basketball
- 1963–1964: Salem
- 1965–1968: La Salle

Coaching career (HC unless noted)

Men's basketball
- 1968–1977: La Salle (assistant)
- 1977–1979: La Salle College HS
- 1979–1986: La Salle
- 1986–1990: Wildwood/Philadelphia Aces
- 1987–1988: William Penn
- 1992–2000: Shipley
- 2000–2001: Friends Select

Women's basketball
- 1991–1992: Springfield HS (PA)

Head coaching record
- Overall: 119–87 (.578) (NCAA Division I); 54–43 (.557) (USBL)
- Tournaments: 1–2 (.333)

Accomplishments and honors

Championships
- 2x East Coast Conference men's basketball tournament champion (1980, 1983)

Awards
- 1x USBL coach of the year (1988)

Dave "Lefty" Ervin is an American basketball player and coach who played and coached at La Salle University. He was a forward on the La Salle Explorers men's basketball teams from 1965 to 1968 and was the team's head coach from 1979 to 1986.

== Playing ==
Ervin grew up in Pittsburgh, but played for Abington Senior High School after his family moved to Abington Township, Montgomery County, Pennsylvania before his freshman year. He began his college career at Salem College. He transferred to LaSalle in 1964 and sat out that season due to NCAA rules. He was the Explorers' second leading scorer during the 1965–66 season, averaging 14.6 points per game, 6.5 rebounds per game, and 3.5 assists per game. He received less playing time following the arrival of future National Basketball Association players Larry Cannon and Bernie Williams in 1966. He averaged 5.7 points per game in 1966–67 and 9.3 and 1967–68. He scored two points in LaSalle's 83–69 loss to Columbia at the 1968 NCAA University Division basketball tournament. Ervin was also a standout for the La Salle Explorers baseball and was captain of both the basketball and baseball teams his senior season.

== Coaching ==
Shortly after graduating, Ervin was hired by LaSalle as an assistant varsity baseball coach and assistant freshman basketball coach. Head basketball coach Tom Gola resigned in 1970 and Ervin was retained by his successor, Paul Westhead. He left in 1977 to become the head coach at La Salle College High School.

Ervin returned to La Salle as head coach in 1979 after Westhead resigned to become an assistant coach with the Los Angeles Lakers. In his first season, the Explorers, led by Michael Brooks, won the East Coast Conference men's basketball tournament and appeared in the NCAA Division I basketball tournament. La Salle's 1982–83 team, which included Steve Black, Ralph Lewis, Albert Butts, Chip Greenberg, and Tom Piotrowski, upset VCU in the first round of the 1983 NCAA Division I men's basketball tournament. The Explorers were the regular season champions of the Metro Atlantic Athletic Conference the following season, but lost in the semifinals of the 1984 MAAC men's basketball tournament. After going 15–13 in 1984–85 and 14–14 in 1985–86, Ervin resigned due to "a little bit of burnout".

One month after leaving La Salle, Ervin was hired to coach the Wildwood Aces of the United States Basketball League. Due to a lack of players, the 41-year old Ervin joined the roster for the season finale against the Springfield Fame. He played 19 minutes and scored 11 points in the Aces' 131–116 victory. In 1987, the Aces relocated to Philadelphia. Ervin was the USBL's coach of the year in 1988. The league suspended the 1989 season and Ervin resigned during the 1990 season due to the team's financial instability.

In 1987, Ervin became the head basketball coach at William Penn Charter School. He worked at Penn Charter while still serving as coach and general manager of the Aces. He then spent one season as the girl's basketball coach at Springfield High School in Springfield, Pennsylvania. In 1992, he became the boy's coach at the Shipley School. He remained there until 2000, when he became the head coach at the Friends Select School.
