= 1979 East Coast Conference (Division I) men's basketball tournament =

Basketball Tournament

- Classification: Division I
- Season: 1978–79
- Teams: 12
- First round site: Home Courts
- Quarterfinals site: Home Courts
- Semifinals site: Palestra; Philadelphia, PA
- Finals site: Palestra; Philadelphia, PA
- Champions: Temple (1st title)
- Winning coach: Don Casey (1st title)

1978–79 ECC men's basketball standings
	Conf.				Overall
Team	W		L	PCT	W		L	PCT
East
Temple †	10	–	0	1.000	25	–	4	.862
Saint Joseph's	9	–	2	.818	19	–	11	.633
La Salle	9	–	2	.818	15	–	13	.536
American	7	–	4	.636	14	–	13	.519
Drexel	6	–	5	.545	18	–	9	.667
Hofstra	3	–	8	.273	8	–	19	.296
West
Bucknell	11	–	5	.688	18	–	9	.667
Lafayette	8	–	8	.500	16	–	12	.571
Rider	7	–	8	.467	11	–	15	.423
West Chester	4	–	12	.250	8	–	18	.308
Lehigh	4	–	12	.250	8	–	18	.308
Delaware	2	–	12	.143	5	–	22	.185
† 1979 ECC tournament winner Rankings from AP Poll

The 1979 East Coast Conference men's basketball tournament was held February 26 – March 3, 1979. The champion gained and an automatic berth to the NCAA tournament. Temple University won their first and only title in the entire lifetime of the tournament.

== Bracket and results ==
First round Monday, February 26
4E	American	55
5E	Drexel	66
3W	Rider	70
6W	Delaware	72
4W	West Chester	68
5W	Lehigh	65
3E	La Salle	84
6E	Hofstra	77

Quarterfinals; Wednesday, February 28
1E	#12 Temple	61
5E	Drexel	57
2W	Lafayette	90
6W	Delaware	71
1W	Bucknell	75
4W	West Chester	61
2E	Saint Joseph's	68
3E	La Salle	63

Semifinals; Friday, March 2
1E	#12 Temple	53
2W	Lafayette	50
1W	Bucknell	61
2E	Saint Joseph's	69

Championship; Saturday, March 3
1E	#12 Temple	61
2E	Saint Joseph's	60

* denotes overtime game
