= List of La Salle Explorers men's basketball head coaches =

The following is a list of La Salle Explorers men's basketball head coaches. There have been 21 head coaches of the Explorers in their 94-season history.

La Salle's current head coach is Darris Nichols. He was hired as the Explorers' head coach in March 2025, replacing Fran Dunphy, who retired after the 2024-25 season.

No.	Tenure	Coach	Years	Record	Pct.
1	1930–1931	James J. Henry	1	15–4	.789
2	1931–1933	Tom Conley	2	28–11	.718
3	1933–1941	Leonard Tanseer	8	90–59	.604
4	1941–1943	Obie O'Brien	2	25–21	.543
5	1943–1946	Joseph Meehan	3	28–30	.483
6	1946–1949	Charles McGlone	3	61–17	.782
7	1949–1955	Ken Loeffler	6	145–30	.829
8	1955–1958	Jim Pollard	3	48–28	.632
9	1958–1963	Dudey Moore	5	79–37	.681
10	1963–1965	Bob Walters	2	31–17	.646
11	1965–1967	Joe Heyer	2	24–27	.471
12	1967–1968	Jim Harding	1	20–8	.714
13	1968–1970	Tom Gola	2	37–13	.740
14	1970–1979	Paul Westhead	9	142–105	.575
15	1979–1986	Lefty Ervin	7	119–87	.578
16	1986–2001	Speedy Morris	15	238–203	.540
17	2001–2004	Billy Hahn	3	37–54	.407
18	2004–2018	John Giannini	14	212–226	.484
19	2018–2022	Ashley Howard	4	45–71	.388
20	2022–2025	Fran Dunphy	3	45–55	.450
21	2025–present	Darris Nichols	0	0–0	–
Totals		21 coaches	94 seasons	1,453–1,097	.570
Records updated through end of 2024–25 season Source
