= 1980 East Coast Conference (Division I) men's basketball tournament =

Basketball Tournament

- Classification: Division I
- Season: 1979–80
- Teams: 12
- First round site: Home Courts
- Quarterfinals site: Home Courts
- Semifinals site: Palestra; Philadelphia, PA
- Finals site: Palestra; Philadelphia, PA
- Champions: La Salle (3rd title)
- Winning coach: Lefty Ervin (1st title)

1979–80 ECC men's basketball standings
	Conf.				Overall
Team	W		L	PCT	W		L	PCT
East
Saint Joseph's	10	–	1	.909	21	–	9	.700
Temple	8	–	3	.727	14	–	12	.538
La Salle †	7	–	4	.636	22	–	9	.710
Hofstra	6	–	5	.545	14	–	14	.500
American	5	–	6	.455	13	–	14	.481
Drexel	4	–	7	.364	12	–	15	.444
West
Lafayette	13	–	3	.813	21	–	8	.724
Bucknell	13	–	3	.813	20	–	7	.741
Delaware	7	–	9	.438	9	–	19	.321
Rider	5	–	11	.313	10	–	18	.357
Lehigh	2	–	14	.125	5	–	20	.200
West Chester	1	–	15	.063	3	–	23	.115
† 1980 ECC tournament winner Rankings from AP poll

The 1980 East Coast Conference men's basketball tournament was held February 25 – March 1, 1980. The champion gained and an automatic berth to the NCAA tournament.

== Bracket and results ==
First round Monday, February 25
4E	Hofstra	70
5E	American	69
3W	Delaware	98
6W	West Chester	75
4W	Rider	89
5W	Lehigh	77
3E	La Salle	87
6E	Drexel	76

Quarterfinals; Thursday, February 28
1E	Saint Joseph's	70
4E	Hofstra	59
2W	Bucknell	76
3W	Delaware	65
1W	Lafayette	80
4W	Rider	68
2E	Temple	62
3E	La Salle	70

Semifinals; Friday, February 29
1E	Saint Joseph's	76
2W	Bucknell	71
1W	Lafayette	62
3E	La Salle	70

Championship; Saturday, March 1
1E	Saint Joseph's	49
3E	La Salle	59

* denotes overtime game
