= 1975 East Coast Conference (Division I) men's basketball tournament =

- Classification: Division I
- Season: 1974–75
- Teams: 4
- Site: Kirby Sports Center; Easton, PA
- Champions: La Salle (1st title)
- Winning coach: Paul Westhead (1st title)

1974–75 ECC men's basketball standings
	Conf.				Overall
Team	W		L	PCT	W		L	PCT
East
American	5	–	1	.833	16	–	10	.615
La Salle †	5	–	1	.833	22	–	7	.759
Temple	4	–	2	.667	7	–	19	.269
Hofstra	3	–	3	.500	11	–	13	.458
Saint Joseph's	3	–	3	.500	8	–	17	.320
West Chester	1	–	5	.167	8	–	17	.320
Drexel	0	–	6	.000	12	–	11	.522
West
Lafayette	7	–	1	.875	22	–	6	.786
Rider	5	–	3	.625	16	–	11	.593
Bucknell	4	–	4	.500	14	–	12	.538
Delaware	4	–	4	.500	12	–	13	.480
Lehigh	0	–	8	.000	1	–	23	.042
† 1975 ECC tournament winner Rankings from AP Poll

The 1975 East Coast Conference men's basketball tournament was held March 7–8, 1975. The champion gained and an automatic berth to the NCAA tournament.

== Bracket and results ==
Semifinals; Friday, March 7
1	Lafayette	79
4	Rider	68
2	American	52
3	La Salle	56

Final; Saturday, March 8
1	Lafayette	85
3	La Salle	92

* denotes overtime game
