= 1984–85 Lehigh Engineers men's basketball team =

American college basketball season

1984–85 Lehigh Engineers men's basketball

ECC tournament champions

NCAA tournament
- Conference: East Coast Conference
- Record: 12–19 (6–8 ECC)
- Head coach: Tom Schneider
- Assistant coach: Fran McCaffery (2nd season)
- Home arena: Stabler Arena

1984–85 ECC men's basketball standings
	Conf.				Overall
Team	W		L	PCT	W		L	PCT
Bucknell	10	–	4	.714	19	–	10	.655
Lafayette	8	–	6	.571	15	–	13	.536
Drexel	8	–	6	.571	10	–	18	.357
Rider	7	–	7	.500	14	–	15	.483
Delaware	7	–	7	.500	12	–	16	.429
Lehigh †	6	–	8	.429	12	–	19	.387
Hofstra	5	–	9	.357	14	–	15	.483
Towson State	5	–	9	.357	7	–	21	.250
† 1985 ECC tournament winner Rankings from AP poll

The 1984–85 Lehigh Engineers men's basketball team represented Lehigh University during the 1984–85 NCAA Division I men's basketball season. The Engineers, led by head coach Tom Schneider, played their home games at Stabler Arena and were members of the East Coast Conference. They finished the season 12–19, 6–8 in ECC play to finish in sixth place in the conference.

Following the regular season, Lehigh surprisingly won the ECC tournament to earn the conference's automatic bid into the 1985 NCAA tournament. This was the program's first NCAA Tournament appearance. As the 16 seed in the East region, they fell to No. 1 seed and eventual National runner-up Georgetown in the opening round.

After the season, Coach Schneider left the program to take the head coaching job at Penn. Schneider was replaced by assistant coach Fran McCaffery.

== Roster ==
1984–85 Lehigh Mountain Hawks men's basketball team
Players
Coaches

Pos.	#	Name	Height	Weight	Year	Previous school	Hometown
G/F	12	Daren Queenan	6 ft 4 in (1.93 m)	170 lb (77 kg)	Fr	Norristown HS	Norristown, PA
G	24	Mike Polaha	6 ft 3 in (1.91 m)	—	Fr		Allentown, PA

Head coach

- Tom Schneider

Assistant coach(es)

- Fran McCaffery

Legend

- (C) Team captain
- (S) Suspended
- (I) Ineligible
- (W) Walk-on
- Injured
- Current redshirt

Roster

== Schedule and results ==
Date time, TV	Rank^{#}	Opponent^{#}	Result	Record	Site (attendance) city, state
Regular season
Dec 1, 1984*		at Manhattan	L 57–60	0–1	Draddy Gymnasium; New York, New York
Dec 3, 1984*		Siena	L 67–71	0–2	Stabler Arena; Bethlehem, Pennsylvania
Dec 5, 1984*		Wagner	W 83–74	1–2	Stabler Arena; Bethlehem, Pennsylvania
Dec 7, 1984*		at Arizona State	L 64–81	1–3	ASU Activity Center; Tempe, Arizona
Dec 8, 1984*		vs. George Washington	L 49–76	1–4	
Dec 10, 1984*		vs. Robert Morris	L 64–73	1–5	
Dec 22, 1984*		at Fairfield	W 79–75	2–5	Alumni Hall; Fairfield, Connecticut
Dec 28, 1984*		at Marquette	L 56–85	2–6	MECCA Arena; Milwaukee, Wisconsin
Dec 29, 1984*		vs. Drake	L 59–81	2–7	MECCA Arena; Milwaukee, Wisconsin
Jan 2, 1985*		Rider	W 76–59	3–7	Stabler Arena; Bethlehem, Pennsylvania
Jan 5, 1985*		Princeton	L 67–75	3–8	Stabler Arena; Bethlehem, Pennsylvania
ECC Tournament
Mar 2, 1985*	(6)	vs. (3) Drexel; Quarterfinals	W 58–56	10–18	Towson Center; Towson, Maryland
Mar 3, 1985*	(6)	vs. (7) Hofstra; Semifinals	W 72–68	11–18	Towson Center; Towson, Maryland
Mar 4, 1985*	(6)	vs. (1) Bucknell; Championship	W 76–74 ^{OT}	12–18	Towson Center; Towson, Maryland
1985 NCAA tournament
Mar 14, 1985*	(16 E)	vs. (1 E) No. 1 Georgetown; First Round	L 43–68	12–19	Hartford Civic Center; Hartford, Connecticut
*Non-conference game. ^{#}Rankings from AP Poll. (#) Tournament seedings in parentheses. E=East. All times are in Eastern Time.
