= 1992 East Coast Conference (Division I) men's basketball tournament =

- Classification: Division I
- Season: 1991–92
- Teams: 7
- Site: RAC Center; Catonsville, MD
- Champions: Towson State (3rd title)
- Winning coach: Terry Truax (3rd title)

1991–92 East Coast Conference men's basketball standings
	Conf.				Overall
Team	W		L	PCT	W		L	PCT
Hofstra	10	–	2	.833	20	–	9	.690
Towson State †	9	–	3	.750	17	–	13	.567
Rider	9	–	3	.750	16	–	13	.552
UMBC	8	–	4	.667	10	–	19	.345
Central Connecticut State	3	–	9	.250	7	–	21	.250
Brooklyn	3	–	9	.250	5	–	23	.179
Buffalo	0	–	12	.000	2	–	26	.071
† 1992 ECC tournament winner Rankings from AP Poll

The 1992 East Coast Conference men's basketball tournament was held March 7–9, 1992. Its winner did not receive an automatic bid to the 1992 NCAA tournament.

On the tournament's first day, UMBC scored a single-game tournament-record 115 points in an overtime victory over Central Connecticut State, but Towson State broke the record later the same day in a 122–58 win over Buffalo.

The 1992 tournament was the last one the East Coast Conference held until 1994. The conference′s membership fell to three schools for the 1992–93 season, causing it to lose its official conference status under NCAA bylaws, so no conference tournament took place in 1993.

== Bracket and results ==
Quarterfinals; Saturday, March 7
4	UMBC	115*
5	Central Connecticut State	107
3	Rider	67
6	Brooklyn	59
2	Towson State	122
7	Buffalo	58

Semifinals; Sunday, March 8
1	Hofstra	77
4	UMBC	74
3	Rider	77
2	Towson State	90

Final; Monday, March 9
1	Hofstra	61
2	Towson State	69

* denotes overtime game
