= 1978 East Coast Conference (Division I) men's basketball tournament =

Basketball Tournament

- Classification: Division I
- Season: 1977–78
- Teams: 12
- First round site: Home Courts
- Quarterfinals site: Home Courts
- Semifinals site: Kirby Sports Center; Easton, PA
- Finals site: Kirby Sports Center; Easton, PA
- Champions: La Salle (2nd title)
- Winning coach: Paul Westhead (2nd title)

1977–78 ECC men's basketball standings
	Conf.				Overall
Team	W		L	PCT	W		L	PCT
East
La Salle †	5	–	0	1.000	18	–	12	.600
Temple	4	–	1	.800	24	–	4	.857
American	2	–	3	.400	16	–	12	.571
Drexel	2	–	3	.400	13	–	15	.464
Saint Joseph's	2	–	3	.400	13	–	15	.464
Hofstra	0	–	5	.000	8	–	19	.296
West
Lafayette	10	–	0	1.000	23	–	8	.742
Delaware	5	–	5	.500	16	–	11	.593
Bucknell	5	–	5	.500	13	–	15	.464
Lehigh	5	–	5	.500	8	–	18	.308
Rider	4	–	6	.400	11	–	16	.407
West Chester	2	–	8	.200	6	–	19	.240
† 1978 ECC tournament winner Rankings from AP Poll

The 1978 East Coast Conference men's basketball tournament was held February 27 – March 4, 1978. The champion gained and an automatic berth to the NCAA tournament.

== Bracket and results ==
First round February 27–28
4E	Drexel	80
5E	Saint Joseph's	90*
3W	Bucknell	88
6W	West Chester	73
4W	Lehigh	67
5W	Rider	60
3E	American	97
6E	Hofstra	77

Quarterfinals; March 1–2
1E	La Salle	89
5E	Saint Joseph's	82
2W	Delaware	72
3W	Bucknell	62
1W	Lafayette	76
4W	Lehigh	65
2E	Temple	99
3E	American	80

Semifinals; Friday, March 3
1E	La Salle	97
2W	Delaware	85
1W	Lafayette	70
2E	Temple	71

Championship; Saturday, March 4
1E	La Salle	73
2E	Temple	72

* denotes overtime game
