= 1977 East Coast Conference (Division I) men's basketball tournament =

- Classification: Division I
- Season: 1976–77
- Teams: 6
- Site: Kirby Sports Center; Easton, PA
- Champions: Hofstra (2nd title)
- Winning coach: Roger Gaeckler (2nd title)

1976–77 ECC men's basketball standings
	Conf.				Overall
Team	W		L	PCT	W		L	PCT
East
Temple	4	–	1	.800	17	–	11	.607
Hofstra †	4	–	1	.800	23	–	7	.767
La Salle	3	–	2	.600	17	–	12	.586
Saint Joseph's	2	–	3	.400	13	–	13	.500
American	2	–	3	.400	13	–	13	.500
Drexel	0	–	5	.000	11	–	13	.458
West
Lafayette	9	–	1	.900	21	–	6	.778
Delaware	7	–	3	.700	12	–	13	.480
Lehigh	6	–	4	.600	12	–	15	.444
Bucknell	5	–	5	.500	10	–	15	.400
West Chester	2	–	8	.200	11	–	14	.440
Rider	1	–	9	.100	8	–	18	.308
† 1977 ECC tournament winner Rankings from AP Poll

The 1977 East Coast Conference men's basketball tournament was held March 1–6, 1977. The champion gained and an automatic berth to the NCAA tournament.

== Bracket and results ==
Quarterfinals; March 1–3
4	Delaware	58
5	La Salle	67
3	Hofstra	99
6	Lehigh	85

Semifinals; Friday, March 4
1	Lafayette	80
5	La Salle	86
2	Temple	58
3	Hofstra	71

Final; Sunday, March 6
5	La Salle	81
3	Hofstra	92

* denotes overtime game
