= 1976 East Coast Conference (Division I) men's basketball tournament =

- Classification: Division I
- Season: 1975–76
- Teams: 6
- Quarterfinals site: Home Courts
- Semifinals site: Palestra; Philadelphia, PA
- Finals site: Palestra; Philadelphia, PA
- Champions: Hofstra (1st title)
- Winning coach: Roger Gaeckler (1st title)

1975–76 ECC men's basketball standings
	Conf.				Overall
Team	W		L	PCT	W		L	PCT
East
Saint Joseph's	4	–	1	.800	10	–	16	.385
Hofstra †	3	–	2	.600	18	–	12	.600
Temple	3	–	2	.600	9	–	18	.333
Drexel	3	–	2	.600	17	–	6	.739
American	1	–	4	.200	9	–	16	.360
La Salle	1	–	4	.200	11	–	15	.423
West
Lafayette	9	–	1	.900	19	–	7	.731
Rider	6	–	4	.600	14	–	13	.519
Bucknell	5	–	5	.500	13	–	13	.500
Delaware	4	–	6	.400	10	–	15	.400
West Chester	4	–	6	.400	8	–	17	.320
Lehigh	2	–	8	.200	9	–	15	.375
† 1976 ECC tournament winner Rankings from AP Poll

The 1976 East Coast Conference men's basketball tournament was held March 1–6, 1976. The champion gained and an automatic berth to the NCAA tournament.

== Bracket and results ==
Quarterfinals; March 2–4
4	Rider	69
5	Temple	85
3	Hofstra	77
6	Bucknell	58

Semifinals; Friday, March 5
1	Saint Joseph's	72
5	Temple	80
2	Lafayette	72
3	Hofstra	77

Final; Saturday, March 6
5	Temple	72
3	Hofstra	79

* denotes overtime game
