= 1994 East Coast Conference (Division I) men's basketball tournament =

- Classification: Division I
- Season: 1993–94
- Teams: 6
- Site: Alumni Arena; Amherst, New York
- Champions: Hofstra (3rd title)
- Winning coach: Butch van Breda Kolff (1st title)

1993–94 East Coast Conference men's basketball standings
	Conf.				Overall
Team	W		L	PCT	W		L	PCT
Troy State	5	–	0	1.000	13	–	14	.481
Northeastern Illinois	4	–	1	.800	17	–	11	.607
Buffalo	3	–	2	.600	10	–	18	.357
Chicago State	2	–	3	.400	4	–	23	.148
Hofstra†	1	–	4	.200	9	–	20	.310
Central Connecticut State	0	–	5	.000	4	–	22	.154
† 1994 ECC tournament winner Rankings from AP Poll

The 1994 East Coast Conference men's basketball tournament was held March 4–6, 1994. Its winner did not receive an automatic bid to the 1994 NCAA tournament.

The East Coast Coast Conference′s membership had fallen to three schools during the 1992–93 season, causing it to lose its official conference status for that season, so the 1994 ECC tournament was the conference's first tournament since 1992. It also was the conference's last tournament, as the conference disbanded at the end of the season.

== Bracket and results ==
Quarterfinals; Friday, March 4
4	Chicago State	77
5	Hofstra	86
3	Buffalo	100
6	Central Connecticut State	62

Semifinals; Saturday, March 5
1	Troy State	89
5	Hofstra	90
3	Buffalo	81
2	Northeastern Illinois	83

Final; Sunday, March 6
5	Hofstra	88
2	Northeastern Illinois	86
