= Don Casey =

American basketball coach

Personal information
- Born: June 17, 1937 (age 89) Collingswood, New Jersey, U.S.

Career information
- High school: Camden Catholic High School (Camden, New Jersey)
- College: Temple University
- Coaching career: 1973–2000

Career history

Coaching
- 1973–1982: Temple
- 1982–1983: Chicago Bulls (assistant)
- 1983–1984: San Diego/Los Angeles Clippers (assistant)
- 1984–1985: Scavolini Pesaro
- 1985–1989: Los Angeles Clippers (assistant)
- 1989–1990: Los Angeles Clippers
- 1990–1996: Boston Celtics (assistant)
- 1996–1999: New Jersey Nets (assistant)
- 1999–2000: New Jersey Nets

Lawrence Donald Casey (born June 17, 1937) is an American former professional and collegiate basketball coach. He has coached two National Basketball Association (NBA) teams, the Los Angeles Clippers and the New Jersey Nets—each for a season and a half. He had previously coached the Temple Owls from 1973 to 1982. He also worked as an assistant coach with the Chicago Bulls (1982–83) and Boston Celtics (1990–1996).

Casey grew up in Collingswood, New Jersey and attended Camden Catholic High School. As a young man in the 1960s, Casey coached at Bishop Eustace Preparatory School in Pennsauken Township, New Jersey, where he was recommended for a job as a JV coach by a friend and took over the varsity squad after the coach left the job. His coaching led to two state championships. Casey coached Bill Melchionni, a high school and college great who eventually played in the pros in the late 1960s with the ABA New York Nets and Philadelphia 76ers.

In his first season as Temple head coach, Don Casey had his team stall with the basketball in the finals of the Volunteer Classic against Tennessee. The final score of the game was Tennessee 11, Temple 6, the lowest scoring major college basketball game since 1938.

Casey was the head coach of Scavolini Pesaro of Italy's Lega Basket Serie A during the 1984–85 season.

Casey was promoted from assistant to head coach of the Los Angeles Clippers on January 19, 1989, succeeding Gene Shue after a 10–28 start to the 1988–89 season and in the midst of an eleven-game losing streak.

As of February 2006, Casey is the vice-chairman of the President's Council on Physical Fitness and Sports, and As of October 24, 2006, Casey is the head coach of the Hollywood Fame of the American Basketball Association's 21st century incarnation.

== Head coaching record ==
=== College ===
Record table
Season	Team	Overall	Conference	Standing	Postseason
Temple Owls (Middle Atlantic Conference) (1973–1974)
1973–74	Temple	16–9	4–2	3rd (East)	
Temple:		16–9 (.640)	4–2 (.667)		
Temple Owls (East Coast Conference) (1974–1982)
1974–75	Temple	7–19	4–2	3rd (East)	
1975–76	Temple	9–18	3–2	T–2nd (East)	
1976–77	Temple	17–11	4–1	T–1st (East)	
1977–78	Temple	24–5	4–1	2nd (East)	NIT First Round
1978–79	Temple	25–4	13–0	1st (East)	NCAA Division I First Round
1979–80	Temple	14–12	8–3	2nd (East)	
1980–81	Temple	20–8	9–2	T–2nd (East)	NIT Second Round
1981–82	Temple	19–8	11–0	T–1st (East)	NIT First Round
Temple:		135–85 (.614)	56–11 (.836)		
Total:		151–94 (.616)			
National champion Postseason invitational champion Conference regular season champion Conference regular season and conference tournament champion Division regular season champion Division regular season and conference tournament champion Conference tournament champion

=== NBA ===
Legend
Regular season	G	Games coached	W	Games won	L	Games lost	W–L %	Win–loss %
Playoffs	PG	Playoff games	PW	Playoff wins	PL	Playoff losses	PW–L %	Playoff win–loss %

Team	Year	G	W	L	W–L%	Finish	PG	PW	PL	PW–L%	Result
LAC	1988–89	44	11	33	.250	7th in Pacific	—	—	—	—	—
LAC	1989–90	82	30	52	.366	6th in Pacific	—	—	—	—	—
NJ	1998–99	30	13	17	.433	7th in Atlantic	—	—	—	—	—
NJ	1999–2000	82	31	51	.378	6th in Atlantic	—	—	—	—	—
Career		238	85	153	.357		—	—	—	—	
