= East Coast Conference (Division I) men's basketball tournament =

East Coast Conference men's basketball tournament (defunct)
- Conference basketball championship
- Sport: College basketball
- Conference: East Coast Conference
- Format: Single-elimination tournament
- Played: 1975–1992, 1994
- Current champion: Hofstra
- Most championships: La Salle (4)

Host stadiums
- Kirby Sports Center (1975, 1977–78, 1983); The Palestra (1976, 1979–1982); Towson Center (1984–1991); RAC Arena (1992); Alumni Arena (1994)

Host locations
- Easton, PA (1975, 1977–78, 1983); Philadelphia, PA (1976, 1979–1982); Towson, MD (1984–1991); Catonsville, MD (1992); Amherst, NY (1994)

The East Coast Conference men's basketball tournament was the conference championship tournament in men's basketball for the East Coast Conference. The tournament was held annually from 1975 and 1992 and in 1994, after which the conference disbanded.

== Tournament champions by year ==
Year	Champion	Score	Runner-up	Venue (and city)
1975	La Salle	92–85	Lafayette	Kirby Sports Center (Easton, PA)
1976	Hofstra	79–72	Temple	The Palestra (Philadelphia, PA)
1977	Hofstra	92–81	La Salle	Kirby Sports Center (Easton, PA)
1978	La Salle	73–72	Temple	Kirby Sports Center (Easton, PA)
1979	Temple	61–60	Saint Joseph's	The Palestra (Philadelphia, PA)
1980	La Salle	59–49	Saint Joseph's	The Palestra (Philadelphia, PA)
1981	Saint Joseph's	63–60	American	The Palestra (Philadelphia, PA)
1982	Saint Joseph's	75–65	Drexel	The Palestra (Philadelphia, PA)
1983	La Salle	75–73	American	Kirby Sports Center (Easton, PA)
1984	Rider	73–71^{OT}	Bucknell	Towson Center (Towson, MD)
1985	Lehigh	76–74^{OT}	Bucknell	Towson Center (Towson, MD)
1986	Drexel	80–76	Hofstra	Towson Center (Towson, MD)
1987	Bucknell	86–74	Towson State	Towson Center (Towson, MD)
1988	Lehigh	84–78	Towson State	Towson Center (Towson, MD)
1989	Bucknell	71–65	Lafayette	Towson Center (Towson, MD)
1990	Towson State	73–60	Lehigh	Towson Center (Towson, MD)
1991	Towson State	69–63	Rider	Towson Center (Towson, MD)
1992	Towson State	69–61	Hofstra	RAC Arena (Catonsville, MD)
1993	No tournament (see note)			
1994	Hofstra	88–86	Northeastern Illinois	Alumni Arena (Amherst, NY)

NOTE: Reduced to three members, the ECC lost its official conference status under NCAA bylaws during the 1992–93 season and did not hold a tournament in 1993.

== Finals appearances by school ==
School	Titles	Finals Apps.	Title Years
La Salle	4	5	1975, 1978, 1980, 1983
Hofstra	3	5	1976, 1977, 1994
Towson State	3	5	1990, 1991, 1992
Bucknell	2	4	1987, 1989
Lehigh	2	3	1985, 1988
Saint Joseph's	2	4	1981, 1982
Drexel	1	2	1986
Rider	1	2	1984
Temple	1	3	1979
American	0	2	—
Lafayette	0	2	—
Northeastern Illinois	0	1	—
