= 1985 East Coast Conference (Division I) men's basketball tournament =

Basketball Tournament

- Classification: Division I
- Season: 1984–85
- Teams: 8
- Site: Towson Center; Towson, MD
- Champions: Lehigh (1st title)
- Winning coach: Tom Schneider (1st title)
- MVP: Mike Polaha (Lehigh)

1984–85 ECC men's basketball standings
| | Conf. | | | | Overall |
| Team | W | | L | PCT | W | | L | PCT |
|---|---|---|---|---|---|---|---|---|
| Bucknell | 10 | – | 4 | .714 | 19 | – | 10 | .655 |
| Lafayette | 8 | – | 6 | .571 | 15 | – | 13 | .536 |
| Drexel | 8 | – | 6 | .571 | 10 | – | 18 | .357 |
| Rider | 7 | – | 7 | .500 | 14 | – | 15 | .483 |
| Delaware | 7 | – | 7 | .500 | 12 | – | 16 | .429 |
| Lehigh † | 6 | – | 8 | .429 | 12 | – | 19 | .387 |
| Hofstra | 5 | – | 9 | .357 | 14 | – | 15 | .483 |
| Towson State | 5 | – | 9 | .357 | 7 | – | 21 | .250 |
† 1985 ECC tournament winner Rankings from AP poll

The 1985 East Coast Conference men's basketball tournament was held March 2–4, 1985. The champion gained and an automatic berth to the NCAA tournament.

== Bracket and results ==
Quarterfinals; Saturday, March 2
1 | Bucknell | 79
8 | Towson State | 77^{OT}
4 | Rider | 59
5 | Delaware | 58
3 | Drexel | 56
6 | Lehigh | 58
2 | Lafayette | 74
7 | Hofstra | 75

Semifinals; Sunday, March 3
1 | Bucknell | 74
4 | Rider | 62
6 | Lehigh | 72
7 | Hofstra | 68

Final; Monday, March 4
1 | Bucknell | 74^{OT}
6 | Lehigh | 76

== All-Tournament Team ==
- Leroy Allen, Hofstra
- Jaye Andrews, Bucknell
- Tony Duckett, Lafayette
- Mike Polaha, Lehigh – Tournament MVP
- Daren Queenan, Lehigh
- Chris Seneca, Bucknell
