= Germantown Lutheran Academy =

Coordinates: 40.033°N 75.174°W

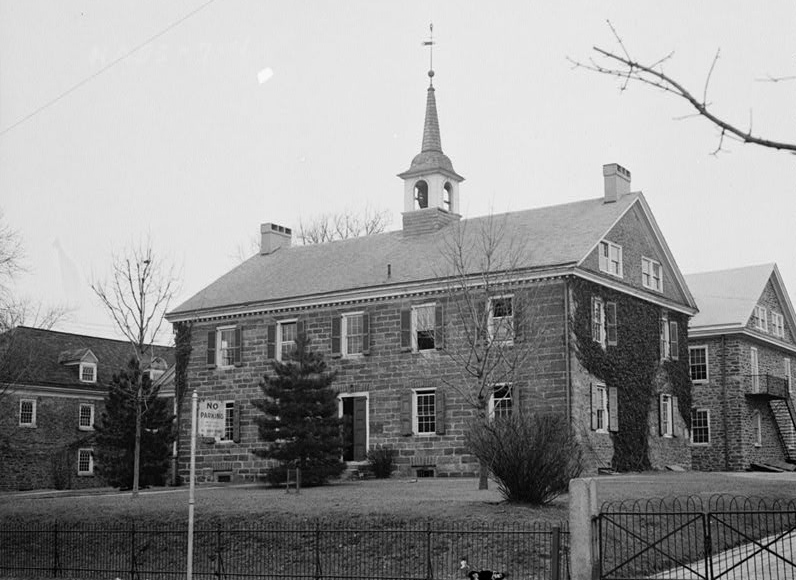
Germantown Lutheran Academy / Germantown Stevens Academy on the campus previous owned by Germantown Academy

Germantown Lutheran Academy (GLA) was founded in 1965 and began operating a high school at the historic school campus previously occupied by Germantown Academy at Schoolhouse Lane and Green Street in the Germantown section of Philadelphia, Pennsylvania. John Dutton, the founding headmaster of Germantown Lutheran Academy, along with three teachers opened the school doors to 34 students in the fall of 1965. Each year the faculty would extend invitations to students to attend the next school year based on academic merit and contributions to campus life. A number of the school's faculty were commissioned teachers from the Lutheran Church – Missouri Synod.

Germantown Lutheran Academy merged with the Stevens School of Chestnut Hill to form Germantown Stevens Academy in 1973.

Germantown Stevens Academy grew to over 200 students offering classes from kindergarten through grade 12 with over 30 faculty and staff serving the school. Class sizes were limited to 25 students to provide personalized learning and development. Robert Brusic, a pastor of the Lutheran Church in America, became the president of Germantown Stevens Academy. Several Lutheran elementary schools throughout the Philadelphia area sent their students to GLA / GSA. The non-sectarian school offered classes in religion and held bi-weekly chapel to support students in their academic development and spiritual life. An extensive interscholastic athletic program supplemented the regular physical education program of the school. An outstanding choral and art program enhanced the school's academic experience.

== Gallery ==
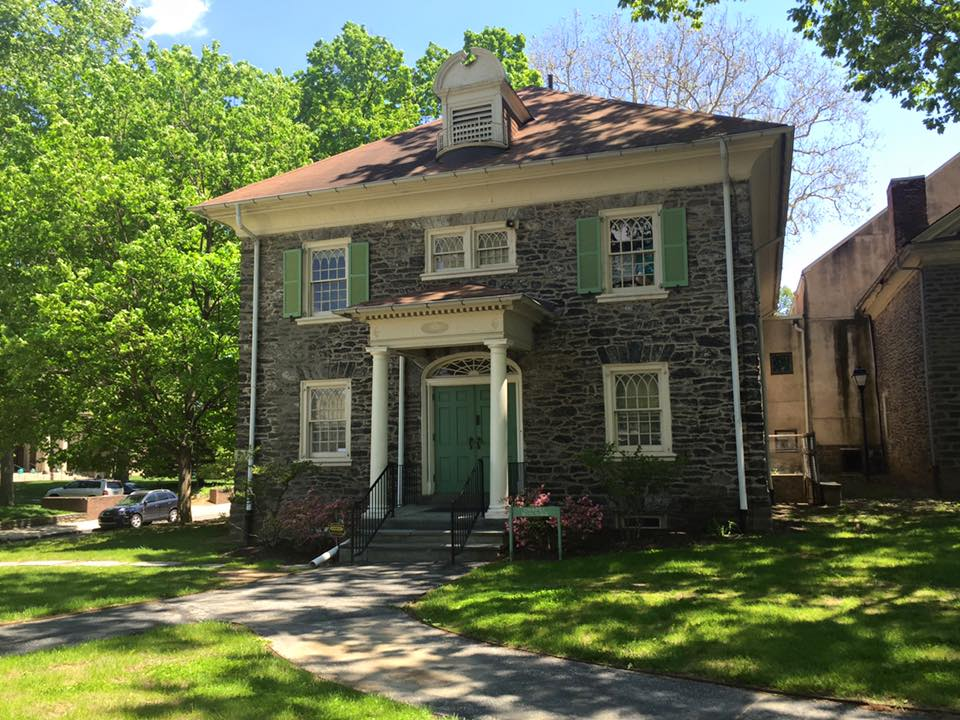
Chapel building

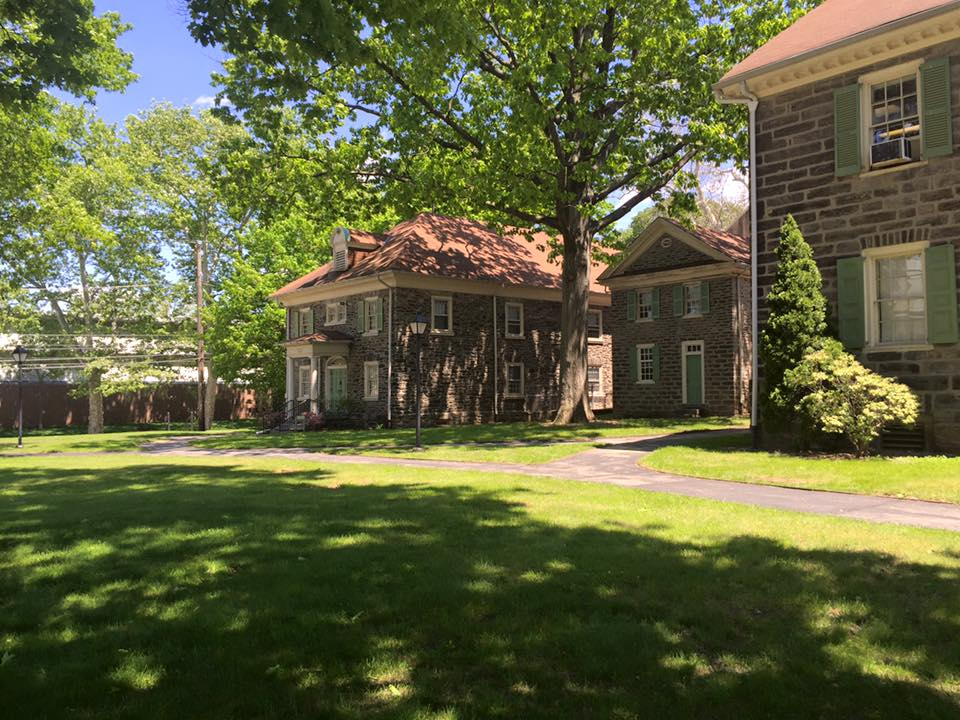
Chapel and main classroom building

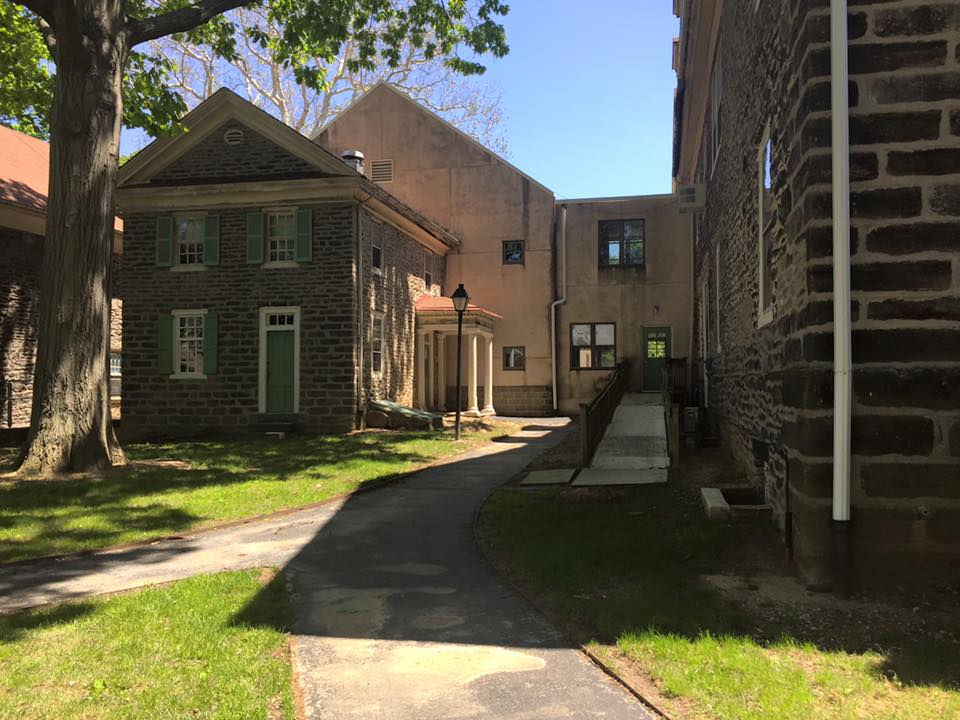
Teacher residence

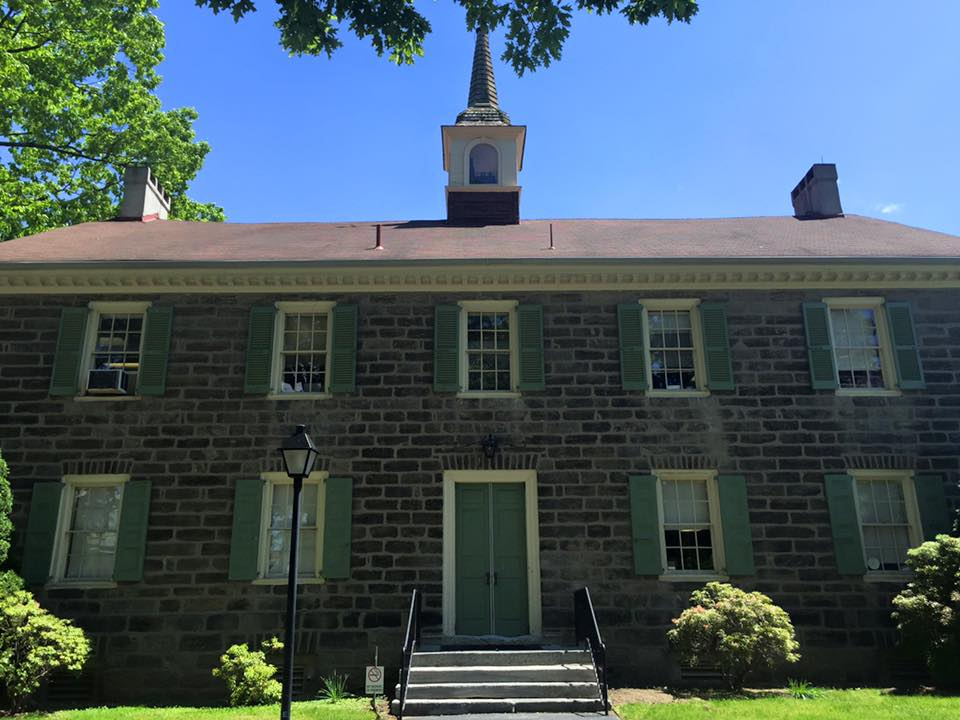
Main classroom building

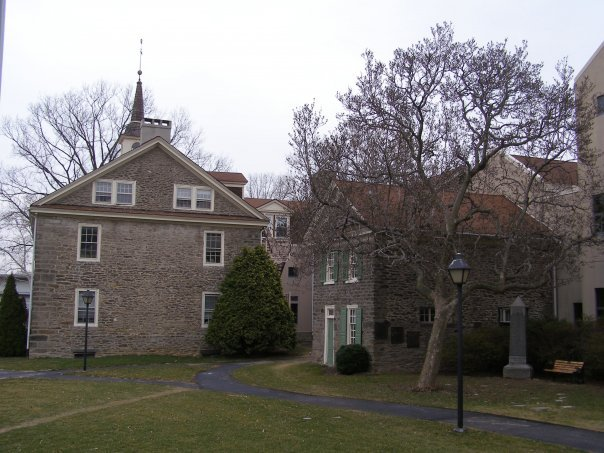
Main classroom building courtyard

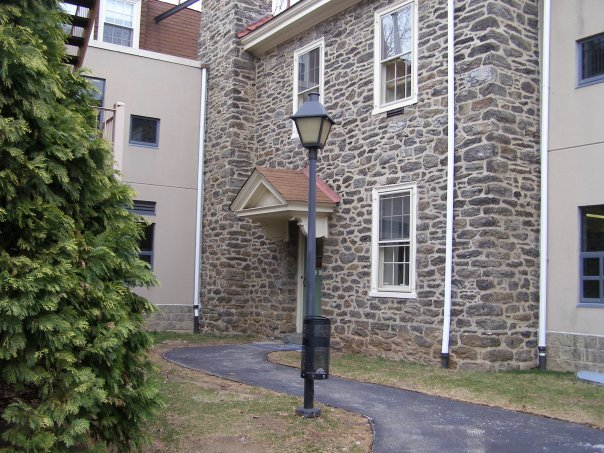
Science room entrance

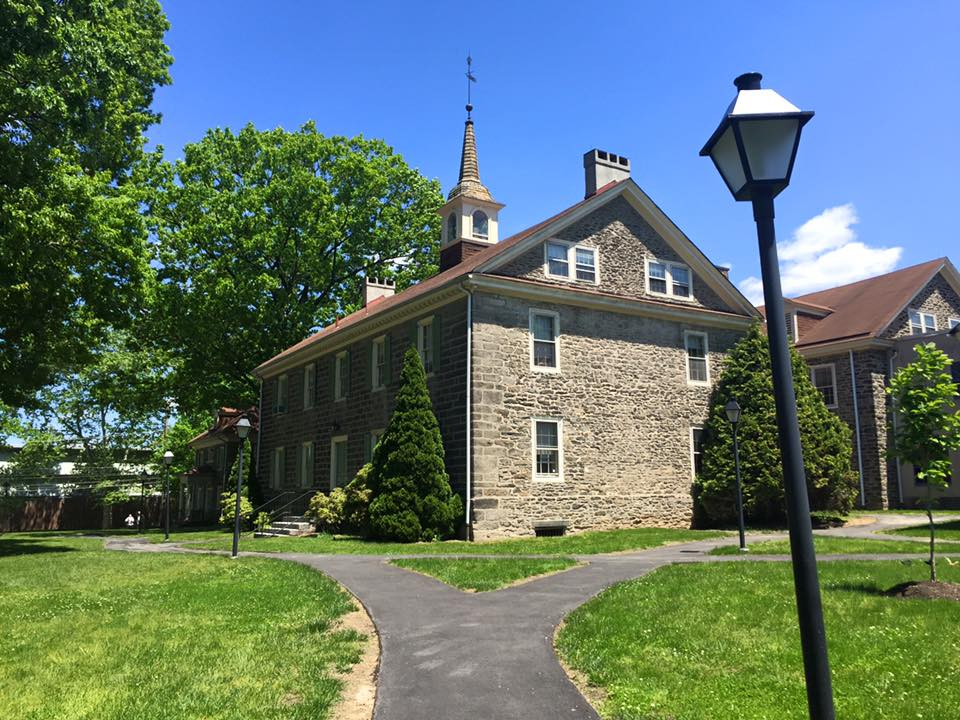
Main classroom building

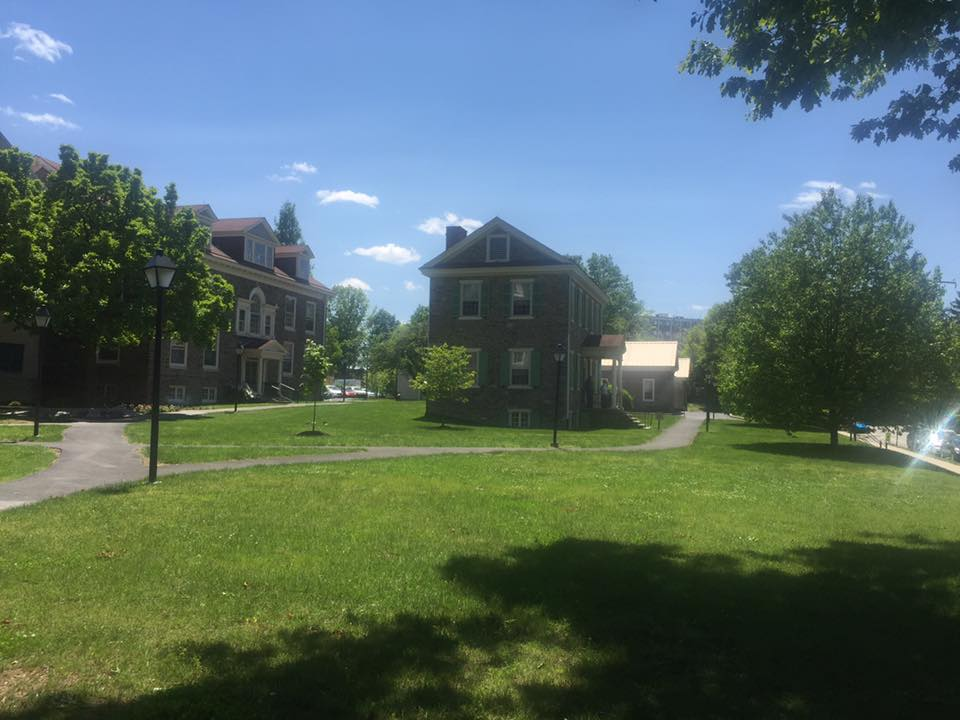
Lower classroom and administration building

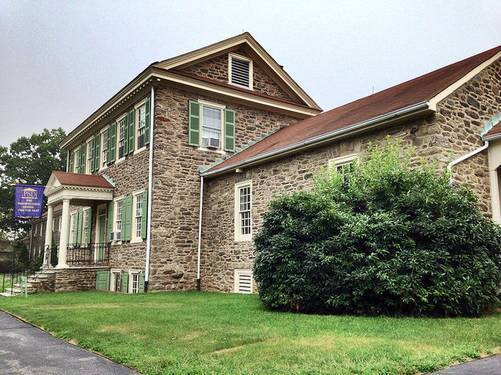
Administration building

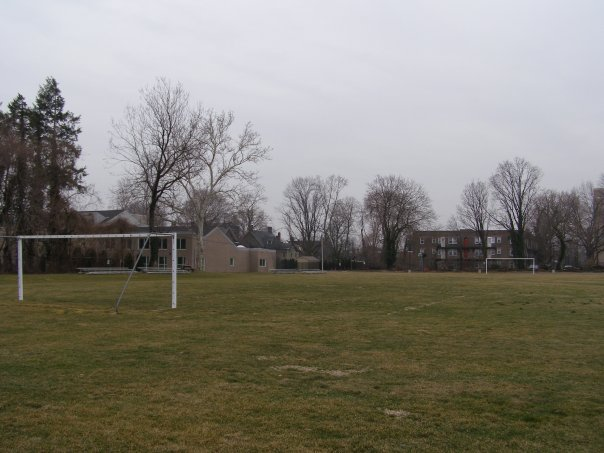
Athletic field view 1

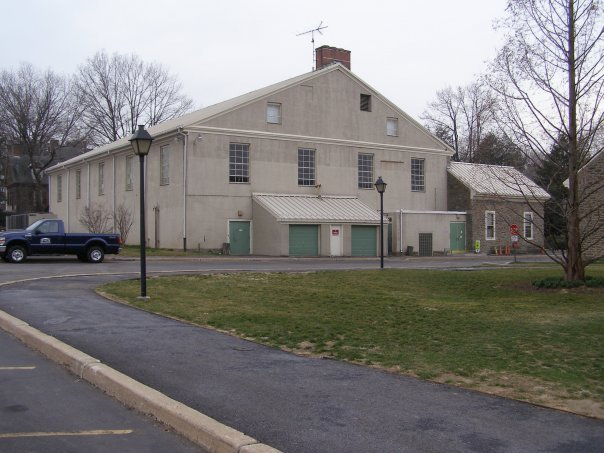
Gymnasium

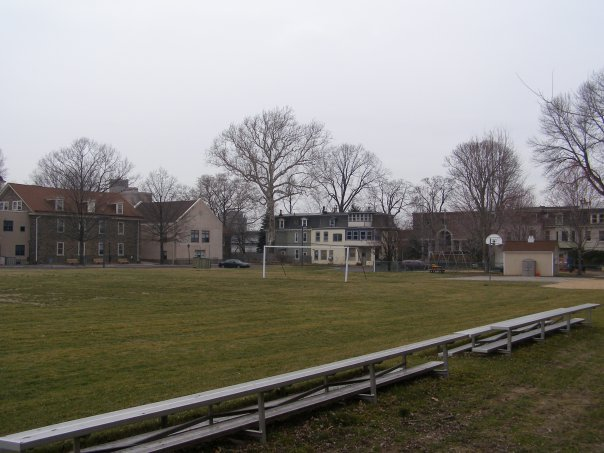
Athletic field view 2
