= Tom Piotrowski (basketball) =

American basketball player

Personal information
- Born: October 17, 1960 (age 66) West Chester, Pennsylvania, U.S.
- Listed height: 7 ft 1 in (2.16 m)
- Listed weight: 240 lb (109 kg)

Career information
- High school: Great Valley (Malvern, Pennsylvania)
- College: La Salle (1978–1983)
- NBA draft: 1983: 3rd round, 62nd overall pick
- Drafted by: Portland Trail Blazers
- Playing career: 1983–1985
- Position: Center
- Number: 54

Career history
- 1983–1984: Portland Trail Blazers
- 1984–1985: Louisville Catbirds
- 1985: Bay State Bombardiers
- Stats at NBA.com
- Stats at Basketball Reference

Thomas Tracy Piotrowski (born October 17, 1960) is an American former professional basketball player.

A 7'1" center from La Salle University, Piotrowski was selected by the Portland Trail Blazers with the 62nd pick of the 1983 NBA draft. He played 18 games for Portland during the 1983–84 NBA season, averaging 1.7 points and 0.9 rebounds per contest. Piotrowski split the 1984–85 season between two teams in the Continental Basketball Association, the Louisville Catbirds and the Bay State Bombardiers. He averaged 6.5 points and 4.7 rebounds over 35 games.

Piotrowski served as boys' basketball coach at Atlantic Christian School in Egg Harbor Township, New Jersey. He currently serves as boys' basketball coach at the Atlantic County Institute of Technology in Mays Landing, New Jersey, where he is also a Video Production Instructor. He is a 1978 graduate of Great Valley High School in Malvern, Pennsylvania.

== Career statistics ==
Legend
GP	Games played	GS	Games started	MPG	Minutes per game
FG%	Field goal percentage	3P%	3-point field goal percentage	FT%	Free throw percentage
RPG	Rebounds per game	APG	Assists per game	SPG	Steals per game
BPG	Blocks per game	PPG	Points per game	**Bold**	Career high

=== NBA ===
==== Regular season ====
Year	Team	GP	GS	MPG	FG%	3P%	FT%	RPG	APG	SPG	BPG	PPG
1983–84	Portland	18	0	4.3	.462	–	1.000	.9	.3	.1	.2	1.7
