= East Coast Conference (Division I) =

American college athletic conference (1958–1994)

- Association: NCAA
- Founded: 1958
- Folded: 1994
- Division: Division I

Locations
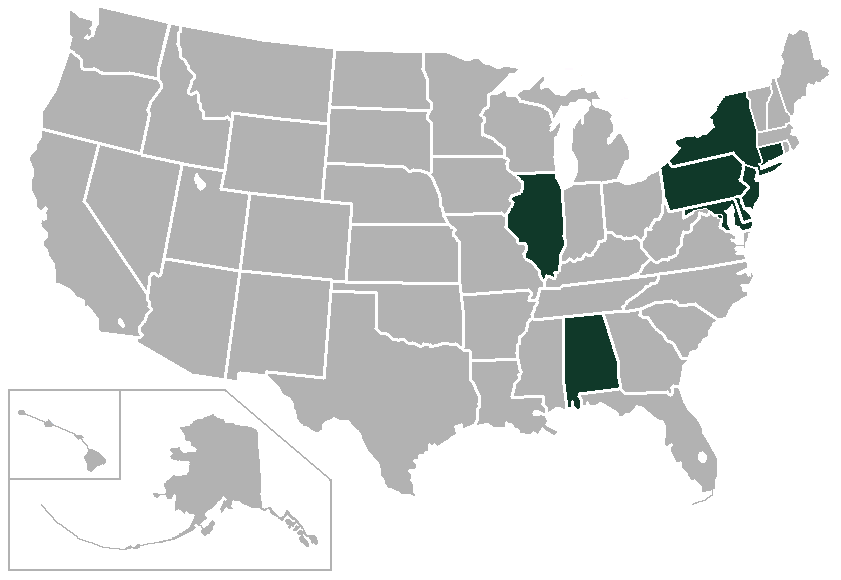

The East Coast Conference was a college athletic conference at the Division I of the National Collegiate Athletic Association (NCAA). It was founded as the university division of the Middle Atlantic Conferences (MAC) in 1958. The MAC consisted of over 30 teams at that time, making it impossible to organize full league schedules in sports like football, basketball, and baseball. In 1958, the larger schools created their own mini conference, consisting of 11 members (7 for football).

In 1974, the larger schools in the MAC officially formed the East Coast Conference. During the 1974-75 through 1981-82 seasons, the ECC enjoyed a consistent membership of 12 teams. That stability was rocked when St. Joseph's, Temple, and West Chester departed in the summer of 1982, while Towson was added, trimming the league to 10 programs. Over the next two years, La Salle and American also said goodbye, cutting the roster to eight.

The winds of realignment would sweep across intercollegiate athletics in full force as the next decade dawned. Bucknell, Lafayette, and Lehigh left to help form the Patriot League in 1990, while Delaware and Drexel headed to the North Atlantic Conference (now known as the America East Conference) in 1991. Attempting to stem the tide, the ECC added UMBC and Central Connecticut in 1990, followed by Division I newcomers Buffalo and Brooklyn in 1991.

More erosion ensued as Rider, Towson, and UMBC moved to other leagues after the 1991–92 campaign, while Brooklyn suspended its entire athletic department. This reduced the ECC to just three members -Hofstra, Central Connecticut, and Buffalo - not enough to maintain official conference status under NCAA bylaws during the 1992–93 season. Unable to move elsewhere themselves, that trio made one last salvage effort.

Spreading far and wide, Chicago State, Northeastern Illinois, and Troy State were enlisted, doubling participation to six teams for the 1993–94 academic year. Finally, the ECC was absorbed by the Mid-Continent Conference (now The Summit League) in the summer of 1994, although Hofstra instead decided to join the North Atlantic Conference. None of the five ECC institutions which entered the Mid-Con at that time remain in the league today.

According to the MAC's website, the East Coast Conference was not a successor to the MAC. Instead, 11 of the 12 University Division members left to form the original ECC in 1974, but the primary organization continued as an NCAA Division III conference when the NCAA adopted a division structure.

June 4–6, 1974 - The first major schism to be focused on this study occurs when the MAC University Division, with 12 members, loses 11 members, who leave to form their own conference (East Coast Conference). American, Bucknell, Delaware, Drexel, Lafayette, La Salle, Lehigh, Rider, St. Joseph's, Temple and West Chester all leave. Gettysburg, which opts to join the College Division, is the only University Division institution to remain.

== Member schools ==
In all tables in this section, school names and nicknames reflect those in use in the last school year each institution was an ECC member. Conference names in the "Next Conference" columns reflect those in use during the first school year of membership in the new league.

=== Founding members ===
Institution	Location	Founded	Type	Enrollment	Nickname	Joined (Note: Represents the calendar year when fall sports competition begins.)	Left (Note: Represents the calendar year when spring sports competition ends.)	Subsequent conference	Current conference
Bucknell University	Lewisburg, Pennsylvania	1846	Private	3,655	Bison	1958	1990	Patriot (1990–present)	
University of Delaware	Newark, Delaware	1743	Public	21,856	Fightin'; Blue Hens	1958	1991	North Atlantic (NAC) (Note: Currently known as the America East Conference since 1996.) (1991–2001)	Conf. USA (CUSA) (2025–present)
Drexel University	Philadelphia, Pennsylvania	1891	Private	25,500	Dragons	1958	1991	North Atlantic (NAC) (1991–2001)	Coastal (CAA) (2001–present)
Gettysburg College	Gettysburg, Pennsylvania	1832	Private	2,600	Bullets	1958	1974	Middle Atlantic (MAC) (Note: Currently an NCAA Division III athletic conference.) (Note: The Middle Atlantic Conferences (MAC) remains in operation, but since 1999 has been an umbrella organization of three conferences. All full MAC members have membership in either the MAC Commonwealth or the MAC Freedom, both of which organize competition in the same set of 14 sports. The third league, the Middle Atlantic Conference (singular), sponsors MAC-wide competition in 13 additional sports.) (1974–92)	Centennial (1992–present)
La Salle University	Philadelphia, Pennsylvania	1863	Private	7,554	Explorers	1958	1983	Metro Atlantic (MAAC) (1983–92); Midwestern (MCC) (Note: Currently known as the Horizon League since 2001.) (1992–95)	Atlantic 10 (A-10) (1995–present)
Lafayette College	Easton, Pennsylvania	1826	Private	2,488	Leopards	1958	1990	Patriot (1990–present)	
Lehigh University	Bethlehem, Pennsylvania	1865	Private	7,070	Engineers (Note: Lehigh adopted its current nickname of Mountain Hawks in 1995.)	1958	1990	Patriot (1990–present)	
Muhlenberg College	Allentown, Pennsylvania	1848	Private	2,225	Mules	1958	1964	Middle Atlantic (MAC) (1964–92)	Centennial (1992–present)
Rutgers University	New Brunswick, New Jersey	1766	Public	65,000	Scarlet; Knights	1958	1962	various (Note: Rutgers had joined the following subsequent conferences: as an NCAA D-I Independent from 1962–63 to 1975–76; the Eastern Athletic Association (Note: Currently known as the Atlantic 10 Conference since 1982.) (EAA) from 1976–77 to 1994–95; the original Big East Conference from 1995–96 to 2012–13; and the American Athletic Conference during the 2013–14 school year.)	Big Ten (B1G) (2014–present)
Saint Joseph's University	Philadelphia, Pennsylvania	1851	Private	9,025	Hawks	1958	1982	Atlantic 10 (A-10) (1982–present)	
Temple University	Philadelphia, Pennsylvania	1884	Public	37,788	Owls	1958	1982	Atlantic 10 (A-10) (1982–2013)	The American (2013–present)

=== Subsequent members ===
Institution	Location	Founded	Type	Enrollment	Nickname	Joined (Note: Represents the calendar year when fall sports competition begins.)	Left (Note: Represents the calendar year when spring sports competition ends.)	Subsequent conference	Current conference
American University	Washington, D.C.	1846	Private	6,776	Eagles	1965	1984	Coastal (CAA) (1984–2001)	Patriot (2001–present)
Brooklyn College	Brooklyn, New York	1930	Public	16,463	Bulldogs	1991	1992	N/A (Note: Brooklyn suspended its athletics program after the 1991–92 school year, before re-instating it back at the NCAA Division III ranks, effective since the 1996–97 school year.)	C.U. New York (CUNYAC) (Note: Currently an NCAA Division III athletic conference.) (1996–present)
University at Buffalo	Buffalo, New York	1846	Public	29,850	Bulls	1991	1994	Mid-Continent (Mid-Con) (Note: Currently known as the Summit League since 2007.) (1994–98)	Mid-American (MAC) (1998–present)
Central Connecticut State University	New Britain, Connecticut	1848	Public	11,865	Blue Devils	1990	1994	Mid-Continent (Mid-Con) (1994–97)	Northeast (NEC) (1997–present)
Chicago State University	Chicago, Illinois	1867	Public	7,131	Cougars	1993	1994	various (Note: Chicago State had joined the following subsequent conferences: the Mid-Continent Conference from 1994–95 to 2005–06; as an NCAA D-I Independent from 2006–07 to 2008–09, also from 2022–23 to 2023–24; the Great West Conference from 2009–10 to 2012–13; and the Western Athletic Conference (WAC) from 2013–14 to 2021–22.)	Northeast (NEC) (2024–present)
Hofstra University	Hempstead, New York	1935	Private	12,400	Flying; Dutchmen (Note: Hofstra adopted its current nickname of Pride in 2000.)	1965	1994	North Atlantic (NAC) (Note: Currently known as the America East Conference since 1996.) (1994–2001)	Coastal (CAA) (2001–present)
University of Maryland, Baltimore County (UMBC)	Catonsville, Maryland	1966	Public	13,979	Retrievers	1990	1992	Big South (BSC) (1992–98); Northeast (NEC) (1998–2003)	America East (AmEast) (2003–present)
Northeastern Illinois University	Chicago, Illinois	1867	Public	11,149	Golden Eagles	1993	1994	Mid-Continent (Mid-Con) (1994–98)	N/A (Note: Northeastern Illinois dropped its athletics program after the 1997–98 school year.)
Rider University	Lawrenceville, New Jersey	1865	Private	5,400	Broncs	1966	1992	Northeast (NEC) (1992–97)	Metro Atlantic (MAAC) (1997–present)
Towson State University (Note: Towson dropped "State" from its name since 1997.)	Towson, Maryland	1866	Public	22,285	Tigers	1982	1992	Big South (BSC) (1992–95); America East (AmEast) (1995–2001)	Coastal (CAA) (2001–present)
Troy State University (Note: Troy dropped "State" from its name since 2005.)	Troy, Alabama	1887	Public	19,579	Trojans	1993	1994	Mid-Continent (Mid-Con) (1994–97); Trans Atlantic (TAAC) (Note: The conference's name was changed to the Atlantic Sun Conference in 2001. The conference was branded as the ASUN Conference between 2016 and 2023, before reverting to its 2001 name while still using ASUN as an official abbreviation.) (1997–2005)	Sun Belt (SBC) (2005–present)
West Chester University	West Chester, Pennsylvania	1880	Public	14,211	Golden Rams	1969	1982	Pennsylvania (PSAC) (Note: Currently an NCAA Division II athletic conference.) (1982–present)	

== Champions ==
=== Men's basketball ===
==== Regular season ====
- 1959 St. Joseph’s
- 1960 St. Joseph’s
- 1961 St. Joseph’s
- 1962 St. Joseph’s
- 1963 St. Joseph’s
- 1964 Temple
- 1965 St. Joseph’s
- 1966 St. Joseph’s
- 1967 Temple
- 1968 La Salle
- 1969 Temple
- 1970 St. Joseph’s (East) / Rider (West) / Lehigh (West) / Lafayette (West)
- 1971 St. Joseph’s (East) / Lafayette (West)
- 1972 Temple (East) / Rider (West)
- 1973 St. Joseph’s (East) / Lafayette (West)
- 1974 St. Joseph’s (East) / La Salle (East) / Rider (West)
- 1975 American (East) / La Salle (East) / Lafayette (West)
- 1976 St. Joseph’s (East) / Lafayette (West)
- 1977 Temple (East) / Hofstra (East) / Lafayette (West)
- 1978 La Salle (East) / Lafayette (West)
- 1979 Temple (East) / Bucknell (West)
- 1980 St. Joseph’s (East) / Lafayette (West)
- 1981 American (East) / Lafayette (West) / Rider (West)
- 1982 Temple (East) / West Chester (West)
- 1983 American (East) / La Salle (East) / Hofstra (East) / Rider (West)
- 1984 Bucknell
- 1985 Bucknell
- 1986 Drexel
- 1987 Bucknell
- 1988 Lafayette
- 1989 Bucknell
- 1990 Towson/Hofstra/Lehigh
- 1991 Towson
- 1992 Hofstra
- 1993 No Championship
- 1994 Troy State

==== Conference tournament ====
- 1975 La Salle
- 1976 Hofstra
- 1977 Hofstra
- 1978 La Salle
- 1979 Temple
- 1980 La Salle
- 1981 St. Joseph’s
- 1982 St. Joseph’s
- 1983 La Salle
- 1984 Rider
- 1985 Lehigh
- 1986 Drexel
- 1987 Bucknell
- 1988 Lehigh
- 1989 Bucknell
- 1990 Towson
- 1991 Towson
- 1992 Towson
- 1993 No tournament
- 1994 Hofstra
