= Lehigh Mountain Hawks men's basketball =

NCAA Division I basketball team

| 2026–27 Lehigh Mountain Hawks men's basketball team |
- University: Lehigh University
- Head coach: Brett Reed (20th season)
- Location: Bethlehem, Pennsylvania, U.S.
- Arena: Stabler Arena (capacity: 6,000)
- Conference: Patriot
- Nickname: Mountain Hawks
- Colors: Brown and white

NCAA Division I tournament round of 32
- 2012

NCAA Division I tournament appearances
- 1985, 1988, 2004, 2010, 2012, 2026

Conference tournament champions
- ECC: 1985, 1988; Patriot: 2004, 2010, 2012, 2026

Conference regular-season champions
- ECC: 1970, 1990 (co-champion); Patriot: 2004 (co-champion), 2010

Uniforms
| Home | Away |

The Lehigh Mountain Hawks men's basketball team — known as the Lehigh Engineers until 1995 — represents Lehigh University in Bethlehem, Pennsylvania in NCAA Division I competition. They have competed in the Patriot League since the circuit became an all-sport conference in 1990. Its home games are played at Stabler Arena.

After ending their independent status in 1974, they were a member of the East Coast Conference until 1990. Lehigh made their first NCAA Division I tournament in 1985, doing so by winning the conference tournament. With a 12-18 record, they became the first team to reach the Tournament with a record below .500. The Mountain Hawks have appeared six times in the NCAA Division I men's basketball tournament, most recently in 2026. The Mountain Hawks are currently coached by Dr. Brett Reed.

The Mountain Hawks men's basketball team is best known for defeating the second seeded Duke Blue Devils in the 2012 NCAA Division I men's basketball tournament, led by future NBA player CJ McCollum.

== Seasons ==
Record table
| Season | Coach | Overall | Conference | Standing | Postseason |
|---|---|---|---|---|---|
Independent (1901–1974)
| 1901–02 | J. W. Pollard | 9–5 | | | |
| 1902–03 | J. W. Pollard | 4–2–1 | | | |
| 1903–04 | J. W. Pollard | 5–2 | | | |
| 1904–05 | J. W. Pollard | 4–5 | | | |
| 1905–06 | J. W. Pollard | 6–6 | | | |
| 1906–07 | J. W. Pollard | 9–2 | | | |
| 1907–08 | J. W. Pollard | 6–1 | | | |
| 1908–09 | J. W. Pollard | 5–5 | | | |
| 1909–10 | J. W. Pollard | 6–2 | | | |
| 1910–11 | J. W. Pollard | 3–4 | | | |
| 1911–12 | J. W. Pollard | 10–4 | | | |
| 1912–13 | J. T. Keady | 12–2 | | | |
| 1913–14 | S. E. Muthart | 12–2 | | | |
| 1914–15 | S. E. Muthart | 9–7 | | | |
| 1915–16 | Harry Hearing | 12–11 | | | |
| 1916–17 | Roy Geary | 15–4 | | | |
| 1917–18 | Roy Geary | 11–9 | | | |
| 1918–19 | Roy Geary | 8–5 | | | |
| 1919–20 | J. Murphy | 5–7–1 | | | |
| 1920–21 | J. Murphy | 6–8 | | | |
| 1921–22 | Ray Fisher | 7–9 | | | |
| 1922–23 | Jim Baldwin | 9–10 | | | |
| 1923–24 | Jim Baldwin | 13–2 | | | |
| 1924–25 | Jim Baldwin | 11–4 | | | |
| 1925–26 | Charles Lingle | 13–1 | | | |
| 1926–27 | Roy Geary | 9–6 | | | |
| 1927–28 | Roy Geary | 10–5 | | | |
| 1928–29 | Roy Geary | 7–7 | | | |
| 1929–30 | Roy Geary | 9–5 | | | |
| 1930–31 | Roy Geary | 4–14 | | | |
| 1931–32 | Roy Geary | 6–11 | | | |
| 1932–33 | F. C. Bartlett | 9–7 | | | |
| 1933–34 | F. C. Bartlett | 5–9 | | | |
| 1934–35 | G. W. Harmeson | 4–10 | | | |
| 1935–36 | G. W. Harmeson | 5–7 | | | |
| 1936–37 | G. W. Harmeson | 5–10 | | | |
| 1937–38 | Paul Calvert | 7–8 | | | |
| 1938–39 | Paul Calvert | 10–5 | | | |
| 1939–40 | Paul Calvert | 5–10 | | | |
| 1940–41 | Paul Calvert | 5–12 | | | |
| 1941–42 | Marty Westerman | 7–8 | | | |
| 1942–43 | James Gordon | 5–10 | | | |
| 1943–44 | Leo Prendergast | 4–12 | | | |
| 1944–45 | Leo Prendergast | 2–14 | | | |
| 1945–46 | Leo Prendergast | 3–13 | | | |
| 1946–47 | Dan Yarbro | 5–13 | | | |
| 1947–48 | Dan Yarbro | 2–16 | | | |
| 1948–49 | Dan Yarbro | 7–11 | | | |
| 1949–50 | Dan Yarbro | 4–14 | | | |
| 1950–51 | Tony Packer | 6–13 | | | |
| 1951–52 | Tony Packer | 7–12 | | | |
| 1952–53 | Tony Packer | 12–8 | | | |
| 1953–54 | Tony Packer | 8–12 | | | |
| 1954–55 | Tony Packer | 10–11 | | | |
| 1955–56 | Tony Packer | 7–11 | | | |
| 1956–57 | Tony Packer | 8–10 | | | |
| 1957–58 | Tony Packer | 8–10 | | | |
| 1958–59 | Tony Packer | 6–16 | | | |
| 1959–60 | Tony Packer | 6–16 | | | |
| 1960–61 | Tony Packer | 5–16 | | | |
| 1961–62 | Tony Packer | 7–12 | | | |
| 1962–63 | Tony Packer | 6–19 | | | |
| 1963–64 | Tony Packer | 5–17 | | | |
| 1964–65 | Tony Packer | 7–13 | | | |
| 1965–66 | Tony Packer | 4–17 | | | |
| 1966–67 | Pete Carril | 11–12 | | | |
| 1967–68 | Roy Heckman | 12–11 | | | |
| 1968–69 | Roy Heckman | 7–17 | | | |
| 1969–70 | Roy Heckman | 13–14 | | | |
| 1970–71 | Roy Heckman | 10–16 | | | |
| 1971–72 | Roy Heckman | 10–14 | | | |
| 1972–73 | Tom Pugliese | 8–17 | | | |
| 1973–74 | Tom Pugliese | 3–21 | | | |
East Coast Conference (1974–1990)
| 1974–75 | Tom Pugliese | 1–23 | 0–8 | 5th West/Last | |
| 1975–76 | Brian Hill | 9–15 | 1–9 | 6th West/Last | |
| 1976–77 | Brian Hill | 12–15 | 6–4 | 3rd West | |
| 1977–78 | Brian Hill | 8–18 | 5–5 | 4th West | |
| 1978–79 | Brian Hill | 8–18 | 4–12 | 5th West | |
| 1979–80 | Brian Hill | 5–20 | 2–14 | 5th West | |
| 1980–81 | Brian Hill | 14–12 | 6–10 | 3rd West | |
| 1981–82 | Brian Hill | 9–17 | 3–13 | 5th West | |
| 1982–83 | Brian Hill | 10–16 | 3–11 | 5th West/Last | |
| 1983–84 | Tom Schneider | 4–23 | 3–13 | 9th/Last | |
| 1984–85 | Tom Schneider | 12–19 | 6–8 | 6th | NCAA Round of 64 |
| 1985–86 | Fran McCaffery | 13–15 | 6–8 | 5th | |
| 1986–87 | Fran McCaffery | 15–14 | 8–6 | 3rd | |
| 1987–88 | Fran McCaffery | 21–10 | 8–6 | 4th | NCAA Round of 64 |
| 1988–89 | Dave Duke | 10–18 | 5–9 | 7th | |
| 1989–90 | Dave Duke | 18–12 | 8–6 | 1st | |
Patriot League (1990–present)
| 1990–91 | Dave Duke | 19–10 | 10–2 | 2nd | |
| 1991–92 | Dave Duke | 14–15 | 8–6 | 4th | |
| 1992–93 | Dave Duke | 4–23 | 2–12 | 8th/Last | |
| 1993–94 | Dave Duke | 10–17 | 6–8 | 6th | |
| 1994–95 | Dave Duke | 11–16 | 5–9 | 6th | |
| 1995–96 | Dave Duke | 4–23 | 2–10 | 6th | |
| 1996–97 | Sal Mentesana | 1–26 | 1–11 | 7th/Last | |
| 1997–98 | Sal Mentesana | 10–17 | 4–8 | 5th | |
| 1998–99 | Sal Mentesana | 6–22 | 0–12 | 7th/Last | |
| 1999–00 | Sal Mentesana | 8–21 | 3–9 | 6th | |
| 2000–01 | Sal Mentesana | 13–16 | 6–6 | 4th | |
| 2001–02 | Sal Mentesana | 5–23 | 2–12 | 8th/Last | |
| 2002–03 | Billy Taylor | 16–12 | 8–6 | 4th | |
| 2003–04 | Billy Taylor | 20–11 | 10–4 | 1st | NCAA Round of 64 |
| 2004–05 | Billy Taylor | 1–28* | 1–13* | 8th/Last | |
| 2005–06 | Billy Taylor | 19–12 | 11–3 | 3rd | |
| 2006–07 | Billy Taylor | 12–19 | 7–7 | 3rd | |
| 2007–08 | Brett Reed | 14–15 | 7–7 | 4th | |
| 2008–09 | Brett Reed | 15–14 | 5–9 | 5th | |
| 2009–10 | Brett Reed | 22–11 | 10–4 | 1st | NCAA Round of 64 |
| 2010–11 | Brett Reed | 16–15 | 6–8 | 4th | |
| 2011–12 | Brett Reed | 27–8 | 11–3 | 2nd | NCAA Round of 32 |
| 2012–13 | Brett Reed | 21–10 | 10–4 | 3rd | CBI First Round |
| 2013–14 | Brett Reed | 14–18 | 7–11 | 6th | |
| 2014–15 | Brett Reed | 16–14 | 10–8 | 3rd | |
| 2015–16 | Brett Reed | 17–15 | 13–5 | 2nd | |
| 2016–17 | Brett Reed | 20–12 | 12–6 | 3rd | |
| 2017–18 | Brett Reed | 16–14 | 11–7 | 4th | |
| 2018–19 | Brett Reed | 20–11 | 12–6 | 3rd | |
| 2019–20 | Brett Reed | 11–21 | 7–11 | 8th | |
| 2020–21 | Brett Reed | 4–11 | 4–10 | 10th/Last | |
| 2021–22 | Brett Reed | 13–19 | 10–8 | 4th | |
| 2022–23 | Brett Reed | 16–14 | 11–7 | 3rd | |
| 2023–24 | Brett Reed | 14–18 | 9–9 | 6th | |
| 2024–25 | Brett Reed | 11–19 | 6–12 | 9th | |
| 2025–26 | Brett Reed | 18–17 | 11–7 | T–2nd | NCAA First Four |
| Total: | | 1,163–1,532–2 | | | |
National champion Postseason invitational champion Conference regular season champion Conference regular season and conference tournament champion Division regular season champion Division regular season and conference tournament champion Conference tournament champion

- Lehigh voluntarily forfeited 13 wins (12 regular season, 1 Patriot League Tournament) during the 2004–05 season for the inadvertent use of an ineligible player.
- Due to the COVID-19 pandemic, the Patriot League for the 2020–21 season was temporarily divided into three regional mini-conferences based on geography. Each team played a 16-game regular-season schedule which included four matches against each regional opponent. As usual, listed standings position reflected by conference tournament seed.

== Postseason tournaments ==
=== NCAA tournament results ===
The Mountain Hawks have appeared in six NCAA Tournaments. Its combined record is 1–6.

| Year | Regional | Venue | Seed | Round | Opponent | Result |
|---|---|---|---|---|---|---|
| 1985 | East | Hartford Civic Center | 16 | Round of 64 | (1) Georgetown | L 43–68 |
| 1988 | East | Hartford Civic Center | 16 | Round of 64 | (1) Temple | L 73–87 |
| 2004 | St. Louis | University of Dayton Arena | 16 | Opening round | (16) Florida A&M | L 57–72 |
| 2010 | Midwest | Chesapeake Energy Arena | 16 | Round of 64 | (1) Kansas | L 74–90 |
| 2012 | South | Greensboro Coliseum | 15 | Round of 64 | (2) Duke | W 75–70 |
| 2012 | South | Greensboro Coliseum | 15 | Round of 32 | (10) Xavier | L 59–70 |
| 2026 | South | UD Arena | 16 | First Four | (16) Prairie View A&M | L 55–67 |

=== CBI results ===
The Mountain Hawks have appeared in one College Basketball Invitational (CBI). Its record is 0–1.

| Year | Date | Venue | Round | Opponent | Result |
|---|---|---|---|---|---|
| 2013 | March 19 | Arena-Auditorium | First round | Wyoming | L 66–67 |

== Retired numbers ==
Three Mountain Hawk players have had their numbers retired by the University.

Lehigh Mountain Hawks retired numbers
| No. | Player | Years played |
| 3 | CJ McCollum | 2009–2013 |
| 12 | Daren Queenan | 1984–1988 |
| 24 | Mike Polaha | 1983–1988 |

== NBA draft ==
McCollum was the first Lehigh player ever drafted.

| Player | Draft | Round | Pick | Team |
|---|---|---|---|---|
| CJ McCollum | 2013 | 1 | 10 | Portland Trail Blazers |

== Mountain Hawks in international leagues ==
- Jordan Cohen (born 1997), in the Israeli Basketball Premier League
- James Karnik (born 1998)), in the Bàsquet Girona
- Dominic Parolin (born 2002), in the German ProA
