= Drexel Dragons men's basketball statistical leaders =

Statistical leaders of Drexel Dragons

The Drexel Dragons men's basketball statistical leaders are individual statistical leaders of the Drexel Dragons men's basketball program in various categories, including points, rebounds, assists, steals, and blocks. Within those areas, the lists identify single-game, single-season, and career leaders. The Dragons represent Drexel University in the NCAA Division I Coastal Athletic Association.

Drexel began competing in intercollegiate basketball in 1894. However, the school's record book does not generally list records from before the 1950s, as records from before this period are often incomplete and inconsistent. Since scoring was much lower in this era, and teams played much fewer games during a typical season, it is likely that few or no players from this era would appear on these lists anyway.

The NCAA did not officially record assists as a stat until the 1983–84 season, and blocks and steals until the 1985–86 season, but Drexel's record books includes players in these stats before these seasons. These lists are updated through the end of the 2020–21 season.

== Scoring ==
Career
Rk	Player	Points	Seasons
1	Michael Anderson	2,208	1984–85 1985–86 1986–87 1987–88
2	John Rankin	2,111	1985–86 1986–87 1987–88 1988–89
3	Malik Rose	2,024	1992–93 1993–94 1994–95 1995–96
4	Joe Linderman	1,816	1996–97 1997–98 1998–99 1999–00 2000–01
5	Chris Fouch	1,744	2009–10 2010–11 2011–12 2012–13 2013–14
6	Camren Wynter	1,659	2018–19 2019–20 2020–21 2021–22
7	Frantz Massenat	1,646	2010–11 2011–12 2012–13 2013–14
8	Mike DeRocckis	1,620	1995–96 1996–97 1997–98 1998–99
9	Bob Stephens	1,612	1975–76 1976–77 1977–78 1978–79
10	Todd Lehmann	1,538	1986–87 1987–88 1988–89 1989–90
	Damion Lee	1,538	2011–12 2012–13 2013–14 2014–15

Season
Rk	Player	Points	Season
1	Michael Anderson	670	1987–88
2	John Rankin	662	1988–89
3	Malik Rose	627	1995–96
4	Len Hatzenbeller	589	1980–81
5	Tramaine Isabell	587	2017–18
6	Malik Rose	584	1994–95
7	Michael Anderson	582	1985–86
8	Jeff Myers	581	1995–96
9	Damion Lee	578	2014–15
10	Michael Anderson	563	1986–87

Single game
Rk	Player	Points	Season	Opponent
1	John Rankin	44	1987–88	Rider
2	Michael Anderson	43	1987–88	Lehigh
3	Michael Anderson	42	1987–88	Rider
4	Greg Newman	40	1973–74	Franklin & Marshall
	Tramaine Isabell	40	2017–18	Elon
6	Tim Whitworth	38	2001–02	George Mason
7	Michael McCurdy	37	1964–65	Elizabethtown
	Michael Anderson	37	1987–88	Liberty
9	Bob Stephens	36	1978–79	St. Francis (NY)
	Len Hatzenbeller	36	1979–80	Catholic
	Len Hatzenbeller	36	1980–81	Rider
	John Rankin	36	1985–86	Delaware
	John Rankin	36	1987–88	Bucknell
	Michael Anderson	36	1987–88	Bucknell

== Rebounds ==
Career
Rk	Player	Rebounds	Seasons
1	Malik Rose	1,514	1992–93 1993–94 1994–95 1995–96
2	Bob Stephens	1,316	1975–76 1976–77 1977–78 1978–79
3	Samme Givens	1,059	2008–09 2009–10 2010–11 2011–12
4	James Butler	1,013	2018–19 2019–20 2020–21 2021–22
5	John Rankin	886	1985–86 1986–87 1987–88 1988–89
6	Daryl McCoy	864	2009–10 2010–11 2011–12 2012–13
7	Mike Kouser	858	1997–98 1998–99 1999–00 2000–01
8	Dartaye Ruffin	829	2010–11 2011–12 2012–13 2013–14
9	Chaz Crawford	819	2003–04 2004–05 2005–06 2006–07
10	Joe Linderman	808	1996–97 1997–98 1998–99 1999–00 2000–01

Season
Rk	Player	Rebounds	Season
1	Malik Rose	409	1995–96
2	Malik Rose	404	1994–95
3	James Butler	387	2019–20
4	Malik Rose	371	1993–94
5	Bob Stephens	360	1978–79
6	Bob Stephens	340	1976–77
	Joe Hertrich	340	1966–67
8	Malik Rose	330	1992–93
9	Steve Lilly	327	1970–71
10	Samme Givens	313	2010–11

Single game
Rk	Player	Rebounds	Season	Opponent
1	Steve Lilly	30	1971–72	Muhlenberg
2	Dan Promislo	26	1951–52	Franklin & Marshall
	Bob Buckley	26	1954–55	Franklin & Marshall
	Malik Rose	26	1992–93	Vermont
5	Malik Rose	25	1992–93	Vermont
6	Bob Stephens	24	1975–76	American
7	Malik Rose	23	1992–93	St. Francis (PA)
8	Bob Stephens	22	1976–77	Delaware
	Malik Rose	22	1992–93	Boston University
	Malik Rose	22	1993–94	Vermont

== Assists ==
Career
Rk	Player	Assists	Seasons
1	Michael Anderson	724	1984–85 1985–86 1986–87 1987–88
2	Todd Lehmann	668	1986–87 1987–88 1988–89 1989–90
3	Camren Wynter	577	2018–19 2019–20 2020–21 2021–22
4	Frantz Massenat	548	2010–11 2011–12 2012–13 2013–14
5	Bashir Mason	471	2003–04 2004–05 2005–06 2006–07
6	Clarence Armstrong	422	1988–89 1989–90 1990–91 1991–92
7	Bryant Coursey	410	1996–97 1997–98 1998–99 1999–00
8	John Siorek	389	1979–80 1980–81 1981–82 1982–83
9	Brian Holden	379	1992–93 1993–94 1994–95
10	Jeremiah King	358	2001–02 2002–03 2003–04 2004–05

Season
Rk	Player	Assists	Season
1	Todd Lehmann	260	1989–90
2	Michael Anderson	225	1985–86
3	Michael Anderson	197	1987–88
4	Todd Lehmann	191	1988–89
5	Camren Wynter	174	2018–19
6	Frantz Massenat	173	2011–12
7	Alfred MacCart	169	1951–52
8	Camren Wynter	168	2019–20
9	Clarence Armstrong	165	1991–92
10	Michael Anderson	164	1986–87

Single game
Rk	Player	Assists	Season	Opponent
1	Todd Lehmann	19	1989–90	Liberty
2	Clarence Armstrong	17	1991–92	Boston University
3	Michael Anderson	15	1986–87	Rider
	Todd Lehmann	15	1989–90	Towson State
5	Todd Lehmann	14	1989–90	Central Florida
	Frantz Massenat	14	2011–12	Central Florida
	Camren Wynter	14	2019–20	Bryant
8	Michael Anderson	13	1985–86	King's College (PA)
	Michael Anderson	13	1985–86	Bucknell
	Todd Lehmann	13	1989–90	Brown
	Todd Lehmann	13	1989–90	Villanova

== Steals ==
Career
Rk	Player	Steals	Seasons
1	Michael Anderson	341	1984–85 1985–86 1986–87 1987–88
2	Bashir Mason	226	2003–04 2004–05 2005–06 2006–07
3	Chris O'Brien	185	1982–83 1983–84 1984–85 1985–86
4	Phil Goss	166	2001–02 2002–03 2003–04 2004–05
5	John Siorek	149	1979–80 1980–81 1981–82 1982–83
6	Randy Burkert	148	1978–79 1979–80 1980–81 1981–82
7	Tramayne Hawthorne	143	2005–06 2006–07 2007–08 2008–09
8	Camren Wynter	140	2018–19 2019–20 2020–21 2021–22
9	Sammy Mojica	135	2014–15 2015–16 2016–17 2017–18
10	Jeff Myers	132	1994–95 1995–96 1996–97

Season
Rk	Player	Steals	Season
1	Michael Anderson	92	1985–86
2	Michael Anderson	85	1986–87
3	Michael Anderson	84	1984–85
4	Michael Anderson	80	1987–88
5	Bashir Mason	73	2006–07
6	Chris O'Brien	69	1984–85
7	Bashir Mason	66	2003–04
8	Tramayne Hawthorne	60	2007–08
9	Eric Schmieder	57	2002–03
10	Chris O'Brien	56	1983–84

Single game
Rk	Player	Steals	Season	Opponent
1	Chris O'Brien	9	1984–85	Hofstra
2	Michael Anderson	7	1985–86	Coppin State
	Michael Anderson	7	1987–88	Lehigh
	Bashir Mason	7	2005–06	William & Mary
5	Michael Anderson	6	1986–87	Lafayette
	Michael Anderson	6	1986–87	Towson State
	Tramayne Hawthorne	6	2007–08	William & Mary
	Shane Blakeney	6	2025–26	Mount St. Mary's

== Blocks ==
Career
Rk	Player	Blocks	Seasons
1	Bob Stephens	404	1975–76 1976–77 1977–78 1978–79
2	Chaz Crawford	318	2003–04 2004–05 2005–06 2006–07
3	Robert Battle	246	1999–00 2000–01 2001–02 2002–03
4	John Rankin	207	1985–86 1986–87 1987–88 1988–89
5	Amari Williams	186	2020–21 2021–22 2022–23 2023–24
6	Mike Mitchell	163	1980–81 1981–82 1982–83 1983–84
7	Austin Williams	143	2014–15 2015–16 2016–17 2017–18
8	Frank Elegar	137	2004–05 2005–06 2006–07 2007–08
9	Rodney Williams	128	2013–14 2014–15 2015–16 2016–17
10	Malik Rose	121	1992–93 1993–94 1994–95 1995–96

Season
Rk	Player	Blocks	Season
1	Robert Battle	116	2002–03
2	Bob Stephens	107	1975–76
3	Bob Stephens	106	1978–79
4	Bob Stephens	100	1976–77
5	Chaz Crawford	94	2006–07
6	Austin Williams	92	2017–18
7	Bob Stephens	91	1977–78
	Robert Battle	91	2001–02
9	Chaz Crawford	86	2004–05
	Chaz Crawford	86	2005–06

Single game
Rk	Player	Blocks	Season	Opponent
1	Bob Stephens	9	1977–78	Chicago
	Robert Battle	9	2001–02	Northeastern
	Chaz Crawford	9	2005–06	William & Mary
	Leon Spencer	9	2008–09	Loyola (MD)
5	Bob Stephens	8	1978–79	St. Francis (NY)
	Chaz Crawford	8	2006–07	Vermont
7	Bob Stephens	7	1975–76	Gettysburg
	Chaz Crawford	7	2005–06	Vermont
	Chaz Crawford	7	2006–07	Florida Gulf Coast
	Chaz Crawford	7	2006–07	Saint Joseph's
	Rodney Williams	7	2015–16	UNC Wilmington
	Austin Williams	7	2017–18	Drake
	Austin Williams	7	2017–18	James Madison
