= 1987–88 Lehigh Engineers men's basketball team =

American college basketball season

1987–88 Lehigh Mountain Hawks men's basketball

ECC tournament champions

NCAA tournament
- Conference: East Coast Conference
- Record: 21–10 (8–6 ECC)
- Head coach: Fran McCaffery (3rd season)
- Assistant coach: Dave Duke
- Home arena: Stabler Arena

1987–88 East Coast Conference men's basketball standings
	Conf.				Overall
Team	W		L	PCT	W		L	PCT
Lafayette	11	–	3	.786	19	–	10	.655
Delaware	9	–	5	.643	19	–	9	.679
Drexel	9	–	5	.643	18	–	10	.643
Lehigh †	8	–	6	.571	21	–	10	.677
Bucknell	7	–	7	.500	16	–	12	.571
Rider	6	–	8	.429	10	–	19	.345
Towson State	4	–	10	.286	14	–	16	.467
Hofstra	2	–	12	.143	6	–	21	.222
† 1988 ECC tournament winner Rankings from AP poll

The 1987–88 Lehigh Engineers men's basketball team represented Lehigh University during the 1987–88 NCAA Division I men's basketball season. The Engineers, led by third-year head coach Fran McCaffery, played their home games at Stabler Arena and were members of the East Coast Conference. They finished the season 21–10, 8–6 in ECC play to finish in fourth place in the conference.

Following the regular season, Lehigh won the ECC tournament to earn the conference's automatic bid into the 1988 NCAA tournament. This was their second NCAA Tournament appearance with their first coming in 1985. As a 16 seed, they fell to No. 1 seed Temple in the opening round.

== Roster ==
1987–88 Lehigh Mountain Hawks men's basketball team
Players
Coaches

Pos.	#	Name	Height	Weight	Year	Previous school	Hometown
G/F	12	Daren Queenan	6 ft 4 in (1.93 m)	170 lb (77 kg)	Sr	Norristown HS	Norristown, PA
G	24	Mike Polaha	6 ft 3 in (1.91 m)	—	Sr		Allentown, PA

Head coach

- Fran McCaffery

Assistant coach(es)

- Dave Duke

Legend

- (C) Team captain
- (S) Suspended
- (I) Ineligible
- (W) Walk-on
- Injured
- Current redshirt

Roster

== Schedule ==
Date time, TV	Rank^{#}	Opponent^{#}	Result	Record	Site (attendance) city, state
Regular season
Nov 28, 1987*		at Pennsylvania	W 96–75	1–0	Palestra; Philadelphia, Pennsylvania
Nov 30, 1987*		at Vanderbilt	L 91–102	1–1	Memorial Gymnasium; Nashville, Tennessee
Dec 2, 1987*		Muhlenberg	W 109–82	2–1	Stabler Arena; Bethlehem, Pennsylvania
Dec 4, 1987*		at Nebraska	L 66–71	2–2	Bob Devaney Sports Center; Lincoln, Nebraska
Dec 5, 1987*		vs. Ball State	W 72–64	3–2	
Dec 7, 1987*		Penn State	W 79–72	4–2	Stabler Arena; Bethlehem, Pennsylvania
Dec 9, 1987*		at Princeton	L 82–95	4–3	Jadwin Gymnasium; Princeton, New Jersey
Dec 23, 1987*		Wilkes	W 116–64	5–3	Stabler Arena; Bethlehem, Pennsylvania
Dec 29, 1987		at Rider	L 82–89	5–4 (0–1)	Alumni Gymnasium; Lawrenceville, New Jersey
Dec 30, 1987*		vs. Monmouth	W 72–59	6–4	
Jan 2, 1988*		Fairfield	W 100–77	7–4	Stabler Arena; Bethlehem, Pennsylvania
Jan 5, 1988*		at Columbia	W 77–65	8–4	Levien Gymnasium
Jan 7, 1988*		Brown	W 102–92	9–4	Stabler Arena; Bethlehem, Pennsylvania
Jan 9, 1988		at Bucknell	W 83–76	10–4 (1–1)	Davis Gym; Lewisburg, Pennsylvania
Jan 12, 1988*		at Harvard	W 62–59	11–4	Lavietes Pavilion; Allston, Massachusetts
Jan 16, 1988		Rider	W 91–65	12–4 (2–1)	Stabler Arena; Bethlehem, Pennsylvania
Jan 20, 1988		at Hofstra	W 77–63	13–4 (3–1)	Physical Fitness Center; Hempstead, New York
Jan 23, 1988		Drexel	L 85–91	13–5 (3–2)	Stabler Arena; Bethlehem, Pennsylvania
Jan 27, 1988		Lafayette	L 64–66	13–6 (3–3)	Stabler Arena; Bethlehem, Pennsylvania
Jan 30, 1988		at Towson State	W 71–65	14–6 (4–3)	Towson Center; Towson, Maryland
Feb 3, 1988		Delaware	W 86–75	15–6 (5–3)	Stabler Arena; Bethlehem, Pennsylvania
Feb 10, 1988		Bucknell	W 79–72	16–6 (6–3)	Stabler Arena; Bethlehem, Pennsylvania
Feb 13, 1988		Hofstra	W 96–72	17–6 (7–3)	Stabler Arena; Bethlehem, Pennsylvania
Feb 17, 1988		at Drexel	L 86–94	17–7 (7–4)	Daskalakis Athletic Center; Philadelphia, Pennsylvania
Feb 20, 1988		at Lafayette	L 68–73	17–8 (7–5)	Kirby Sports Center; Easton, Pennsylvania
Feb 24, 1988		Towson State	W 77–63	18–8 (8–5)	Stabler Arena; Bethlehem, Pennsylvania
Feb 27, 1988		at Delaware	L 67–79	18–9 (8–6)	Delaware Field House; Newark, Delaware
ECC Tournament
Mar 5, 1988*	(4)	vs. (5) Bucknell; Quarterfinal	W 83–79	19–9	Towson Center; Towson, Maryland
Mar 6, 1988*	(4)	vs. (1) Lafayette; Semifinal	W 67–65	20–9	Towson Center; Towson, Maryland
Mar 7, 1988*	(4)	at (7) Towson State; Championship	W 84–78	21–9	Towson Center; Towson, Maryland
1988 NCAA tournament
Mar 18, 1988*	(16 E)	vs. (1 E) No. 1 Temple; First Round	L 73–87	21–10	Hartford Civic Center (15,608); Hartford, Connecticut
*Non-conference game. ^{#}Rankings from AP Poll. (#) Tournament seedings in parentheses. All times are in Eastern Time (#) during NCAA Tournament is seed with Region.
