= 1988–89 Bucknell Bison men's basketball team =

American college basketball season

1988–89 Bucknell Bison men's basketball

ECC tournament champions ECC Regular season champions

NCAA tournament
- Conference: East Coast Conference
- Record: 23–8 (11–3 ECC)
- Head coach: Charles Woollum
- Home arena: Davis Gym

1988–89 East Coast Conference men's basketball standings
	Conf.				Overall
Team	W		L	PCT	W		L	PCT
Bucknell †	11	–	3	.786	23	–	8	.742
Towson State	10	–	4	.714	19	–	10	.655
Lafayette	8	–	6	.571	20	–	10	.667
Hofstra	7	–	7	.500	14	–	15	.483
Drexel	7	–	7	.500	12	–	16	.429
Delaware	6	–	8	.429	14	–	14	.500
Lehigh	5	–	9	.357	10	–	18	.357
Rider	2	–	12	.143	5	–	23	.179
† 1989 ECC tournament winner Rankings from AP poll

The 1988–89 Bucknell Bison men's basketball team represented Bucknell University during the 1988–89 NCAA Division I men's basketball season. The Bison, led by head coach Charles Woollum, played their home games at Davis Gym and were members of the East Coast Conference. They finished the season 23–8, 11–3 in Patriot League play to be crowned regular season champions. They were also champions of the ECC tournament, to earn an automatic bid to the 1989 NCAA tournament, where they lost in the first round to Syracuse.

== Roster ==
1988–89 Bucknell Bison men's basketball team
Players
Coaches

Pos.	#	Name	Height	Weight	Year	Previous school	Hometown
G	10	Bobby Woolum	6 ft 0 in (1.83 m)	160 lb (73 kg)	Sr	Lewisburg HS	Lewisburg, Pennsylvania
G	12	Mike Joseph	6 ft 0 in (1.83 m)	160 lb (73 kg)	Jr	Hazleton HS	Hazleton, Pennsylvania
F	14	John Watson	6 ft 7 in (2.01 m)	198 lb (90 kg)	GS	Archbishop Walsh HS	Franklinville, New York
F/C	20	Bo Heiden	6 ft 7 in (2.01 m)	210 lb (95 kg)	Sr	Martinsburg HS	Martinsburg, West Virginia
G	24	Bill Courtney	6 ft 2 in (1.88 m)	185 lb (84 kg)	Fr	Robert E. Lee HS	Springfield, Virginia
G	30	Keith Fenton	6 ft 3 in (1.91 m)	191 lb (87 kg)	So	Greater Latrobe HS	Latrobe, Pennsylvania
F	32	Rick Pfaff	6 ft 8 in (2.03 m)	196 lb (89 kg)	Jr	Baldwin HS	Pittsburgh, Pennsylvania
G	33	Ted Aceto	6 ft 1 in (1.85 m)	177 lb (80 kg)	Sr	Radnor HS	Villanova, Pennsylvania
F	34	Mike Diver	6 ft 9 in (2.06 m)	207 lb (94 kg)	So	Fenwick HS	Oak Park, Illinois
C	40	Mike Butts	6 ft 10 in (2.08 m)	215 lb (98 kg)	Sr	Dundalk HS	Baltimore, Maryland
F	42	Keane Bell	6 ft 3 in (1.91 m)	190 lb (86 kg)	So	Walt Whitman HS	Potomac, Maryland
F	44	Bud Albee	6 ft 6 in (1.98 m)	205 lb (93 kg)	Sr	Wellsboro HS	Wellsboro, Pennsylvania
F	50	Greg Leggett	6 ft 7 in (2.01 m)	200 lb (91 kg)	Jr	G.C. Marshall HS	Vienna, Virginia
C	52	Steve Leshinski	6 ft 10 in (2.08 m)	192 lb (87 kg)	So	Hendrick Hudson HS	Crugers, New York
F	54	Mike Walsh	6 ft 5 in (1.96 m)	207 lb (94 kg)	Fr	Comsewogue HS	Port Jefferson Station, New York
G		Rob Joy	6 ft 3 in (1.91 m)	187 lb (85 kg)	So	Morris Central HS	Morris, New York
G		Jon Snyder	6 ft 5 in (1.96 m)	180 lb (82 kg)	Fr	Great Valley HS	Malvern, Pennsylvania

Head coach

- Charles Woollum (William & Mary)

Assistant coach(es)

Legend

- (C) Team captain
- (S) Suspended
- (I) Ineligible
- (W) Walk-on
- Injured
- Current redshirt

Roster

== Schedule and results ==
Date time, TV	Rank^{#}	Opponent^{#}	Result	Record	Site (attendance) city, state
Regular season
Nov 26, 1988*; 8:00 p.m.		at Dayton	L 68–69	0–1	UD Arena; Dayton, Ohio
Nov 28, 1988*; 8:00 p.m.		Susquehanna	W 89–68	1–1	Davis Gym; Lewisburg, PA
Nov 30, 1988*; 8:00 p.m.		Duquesne	W 86–83	2–1	Davis Gym; Lewisburg, PA
Dec 3, 1988*; 7:30 p.m.		at St. Bonaventure	L 73–75	2–2	
Dec 5, 1988*; 8:00 p.m.		Lycoming	W 82–55	3–2	Davis Gym; Lewisburg, PA
Dec 7, 1988*; 8:00 p.m.		Mount St. Mary's	W 90–69	4–2	Davis Gym; Lewisburg, PA
Dec 20, 1988*		at Evansville	L 54–79	4–3	Roberts Stadium; Evansville, Indiana
Jan 4, 1989*; 7:30 p.m.		at Yale	L 76–81	4–4	John J. Lee Amphitheater; New Haven, CT
Jan 6, 1989*; 6:00 p.m.		vs. Manhattan; Naismith-Holiday Inn Classic	W 75–56	5–4	
Jan 7, 1989*; 8:00 p.m.		vs. Keene State; Naismith-Holiday Inn Classic	W 78–66	6–4	
Jan 11, 1989; 8:00 p.m.		Lehigh	W 100–91	7–4 (1–0)	Davis Gym; Lewisburg, PA
Jan 14, 1989; 2:00 p.m.		at Hofstra	W 86–74	8–4 (2–0)	
Jan 16, 1989*; 8:00 p.m.		Army	W 79–77	9–4	Davis Gym; Lewisburg, PA
Jan 18, 1989; 8:00 p.m.		Drexel	W 79–77	10–4 (3–0)	Davis Gym (2,137); Lewisburg, PA
Jan 21, 1989		Rider	W 80–62	11–4 (4–0)	Davis Gym; Lewisburg, PA
Jan 25, 1989; 7:30 p.m.		at Towson	W 77–72	12–4 (5–0)	
Jan 28, 1989; 3:15 p.m.		at Delaware	L 88–102	12–5 (5–1)	Delaware Field House; Newark, DE
Jan 30, 1989*; 7:30 p.m.		at Cornell	W 69–67	13–5	Barton Hall; Ithaca, NY
Feb 1, 1989; 8:00 p.m.		Lafayette	W 77–64	14–5 (6–1)	Davis Gym; Lewisburg, PA
Feb 4, 1989; 3:00 p.m.		at Lehigh	W 81–73	15–5 (7–1)	Stabler Arena; Bethlehem, PA
Feb 8, 1989; 8:00 p.m.		Hofstra	W 89–70	16–5 (8–1)	Davis Gym; Lewisburg, PA
Feb 11, 1989; 2:00 p.m.		at Drexel	L 65–88	16–6 (8–2)	Daskalakis Athletic Center (2,310); Philadelphia, PA
Feb 15, 1989; 8:00 p.m.		at Rider	W 81–75	17–6 (9–2)	
Feb 18, 1989; 7:30 p.m.		Towson	L 83–93 ^{OT}	17–7 (9–3)	Davis Gym; Lewisburg, PA
Feb 20, 1989*; 8:00 p.m.		Saint Francis	W 108–94	18–7	Davis Gym; Lewisburg, PA
Feb 22, 1989; 8:00 p.m.		Delaware	W 81–76	19–7 (10–3)	Davis Gym; Lewisburg, PA
Feb 25, 1989; 3:00 p.m.		at Lafayette	W 69–50	20–7 (11–3)	Allan P. Kirby Field House; Easton, PA
ECC tournament
Mar 4, 1989*; 12:00 p.m.		vs. Rider; ECC Tournament Quarterfinal	W 106–80	21–7	Towson Center; Towson, Maryland
Mar 5, 1989*		vs. Hofstra; ECC Tournament Semifinal	W 89–84 ^{OT}	22–7	Towson Center; Towson, Maryland
Mar 7, 1989*; 7:35 p.m.		vs. Lafayette; ECC tournament championship	W 71–65	23–7	Towson Center; Towson, Maryland
NCAA tournament
Mar 17, 1989*; 1:07 p.m.	(15 MW)	vs. (2 MW) No. 7 Syracuse	L 81–104	23–8	Reunion Arena; Dallas, Texas
*Non-conference game. ^{#}Rankings from AP Poll. (#) Tournament seedings in parentheses. MW=Midwest. All times are in Eastern Time.
