= 1989 East Coast Conference (Division I) men's basketball tournament =

- Classification: Division I
- Season: 1988–89
- Teams: 8
- Site: Towson Center; Towson, MD
- Champions: Bucknell (2nd title)
- Winning coach: Charles Woollum (2nd title)
- MVP: Mike Butts (Bucknell)

1988–89 East Coast Conference men's basketball standings
	Conf.				Overall
Team	W		L	PCT	W		L	PCT
Bucknell †	11	–	3	.786	23	–	8	.742
Towson State	10	–	4	.714	19	–	10	.655
Lafayette	8	–	6	.571	20	–	10	.667
Hofstra	7	–	7	.500	14	–	15	.483
Drexel	7	–	7	.500	12	–	16	.429
Delaware	6	–	8	.429	14	–	14	.500
Lehigh	5	–	9	.357	10	–	18	.357
Rider	2	–	12	.143	5	–	23	.179
† 1989 ECC tournament winner Rankings from AP poll

The 1989 East Coast Conference men's basketball tournament was held March 4–6, 1989. The champion gained and an automatic berth to the NCAA tournament.

== Bracket and results ==
Quarterfinals; Saturday, March 4
1	Bucknell	106
8	Rider	80
4	Hofstra	79
5	Drexel	73
3	Lafayette	72
6	Delaware	70
2	Towson State	90
7	Lehigh	74

Semifinals; Sunday, March 5
1	Bucknell	89
4	Hofstra	84
3	Lafayette	80
2	Towson State	79

Final; Monday, March 6
1	Bucknell	71
3	Lafayette	65

== All-Tournament Team ==
- Ted Aceto, Bucknell
- Mike Butts, Bucknell – Tournament MVP
- Otis Ellis, Lafayette
- Mike Joseph, Bucknell
- Greg Leggett, Bucknell
