= 1986–87 Bucknell Bison men's basketball team =

American college basketball season

1986–87 Bucknell Bison men's basketball

ECC tournament champions ECC Regular season champions

NCAA tournament
- Conference: East Coast Conference
- Record: 22–9 (11–3 ECC)
- Head coach: Charles Woollum (12th season)
- Home arena: Davis Gym

1986–87 East Coast Conference men's basketball standings
	Conf.				Overall
Team	W		L	PCT	W		L	PCT
Bucknell †	11	–	3	.786	22	–	9	.710
Lafayette	10	–	4	.714	16	–	13	.552
Rider	8	–	6	.571	12	–	16	.429
Lehigh	8	–	6	.571	15	–	14	.517
Drexel	7	–	7	.500	14	–	14	.500
Towson State	5	–	9	.357	14	–	16	.467
Hofstra	4	–	10	.286	9	–	19	.321
Delaware	3	–	11	.214	12	–	16	.429
† 1987 ECC tournament winner Rankings from AP poll

The 1986–87 Bucknell Bison men's basketball team represented Bucknell University during the 1986–87 NCAA Division I men's basketball season. The Bison, led by head coach Charles Woollum, played their home games at Davis Gym and were members of the East Coast Conference. They finished the season 22–9, 11–3 in Patriot League play to be crowned regular season champions. They were also champions of the ECC tournament to earn an automatic bid to the 1987 NCAA tournament – the first NCAA Tournament appearance in school history – where they lost in the first round to No. 1 seed Georgetown, 75–53.

== Roster ==
1986–87 Bucknell Bison men's basketball team
Players
Coaches

Pos.	#	Name	Height	Weight	Year	Hometown
F	34	Mark Atkinson	6 ft 4 in (1.93 m)	210 lb (95 kg)	Jr	Erie, Pennsylvania
C	40	Mike Butts	6 ft 10 in (2.08 m)	215 lb (98 kg)	So	Baltimore, Maryland

Head coach

- Charles Woollum (William & Mary)

Assistant coach(es)

Legend

- (C) Team captain
- (S) Suspended
- (I) Ineligible
- (W) Walk-on
- Injured
- Current redshirt

Roster

== Schedule and results ==
Date time, TV	Rank^{#}	Opponent^{#}	Result	Record	Site (attendance) city, state
Regular season
Nov 29, 1986*		at Ohio State	L 62–90	0–1	St. John Arena; Columbus, Ohio
Jan 3, 1987*		Marist	W 66–54	3–4	Davis Gym (720); Lewisburg, Pennsylvania
Jan 10, 1987*		Drexel	W 85–79	5–4	Davis Gym; Lewisburg, Pennsylvania
Jan 19, 1987*		at Maryland	L 68–77	6–7	Cole Fieldhouse; College Park, Maryland
ECC tournament
Mar 6, 1987*		vs. Delaware; Quarterfinals	W 81–71	20–8	Towson Center; Towson, Maryland
Mar 7, 1987*		vs. Lehigh; Semifinals	W 103–100 ^{2OT}	21–8	Towson Center; Towson, Maryland
Mar 8, 1987*		at Towson; Championship game	W 86–74	22–8	Towson Center; Towson, Maryland
NCAA tournament
Mar 13, 1987*	(16 SE)	vs. (1 SE) No. 4 Georgetown; First Round	L 53–75	22–9	The Omni; Atlanta, Georgia
*Non-conference game. ^{#}Rankings from AP Poll. (#) Tournament seedings in parentheses. MW=Midwest. All times are in Eastern Time.
