= 1986–87 Drexel Dragons men's basketball team =

American college basketball season

1986–87 Drexel Dragons men's basketball
- Conference: East Coast Conference
- Record: 14–14 (7–7 ECC)
- Head coach: Eddie Burke (10th season)
- Assistant coach: Jay Wright (1st season)
- MVP: Michael Anderson
- Captain: Michael Anderson
- Home arena: Daskalakis Athletic Center

1986–87 East Coast Conference men's basketball standings
	Conf.				Overall
Team	W		L	PCT	W		L	PCT
Bucknell †	11	–	3	.786	22	–	9	.710
Lafayette	10	–	4	.714	16	–	13	.552
Rider	8	–	6	.571	12	–	16	.429
Lehigh	8	–	6	.571	15	–	14	.517
Drexel	7	–	7	.500	14	–	14	.500
Towson State	5	–	9	.357	14	–	16	.467
Hofstra	4	–	10	.286	9	–	19	.321
Delaware	3	–	11	.214	12	–	16	.429
† 1987 ECC tournament winner Rankings from AP poll

The 1986–87 Drexel Dragons men's basketball team represented Drexel University during the 1986–87 NCAA Division I men's basketball season. The Dragons, led by 10th year head coach Eddie Burke, played their home games at the Daskalakis Athletic Center and were members of the East Coast Conference (ECC).

The team finished the season 14–14, and finished in 5th place in the ECC in the regular season.

== Roster ==
1986–87 Drexel Dragons men's basketball team
Players
Coaches

Pos.	#	Name	Height	Weight	Year	Previous school	Hometown
G	10	Michael Anderson (C)	5 ft 11 in (1.8 m)	—	Jr	Carver HS	Philadelphia, PA
F		John Rankin	6 ft 7 in (2.01 m)	215 lb (98 kg)	So
F		Casper Cooper	6 ft 4.5 in (1.94 m)	220 lb (100 kg)	Sr
C		Rob Johnstone	6 ft 7 in (2.01 m)	—	RS So	New Canaan HS/Navy	New Canaan, Connecticut
G		Todd Lehmann	5 ft 11 in (1.8 m)	—	Fr
G		Troy Stribling	6 ft 0 in (1.83 m)	—	Sr
F		Jim Hardy	6 ft 5.5 in (1.97 m)	170 lb (77 kg)	Fr	Springfield HS	Morton, PA
F		Rick Papes	6 ft 7 in (2.01 m)	—	Sr
F		Pat Rafferty	6 ft 6 in (1.98 m)	—	Sr
C		Brian Raabe	6 ft 8 in (2.03 m)	—	Fr
F		Jimmie Parker	6 ft 6 in (1.98 m)	—	So
F		Mike Staveski	6 ft 8 in (2.03 m)	—	So
G		Chris Arizin (redshirt)	6 ft 5 in (1.96 m)	—	So

Head coach

- Eddie Burke (La Salle)

Assistant coach(es)

- Jay Wright (Bucknell)

Legend

- (C) Team captain
- (S) Suspended
- (I) Ineligible
- (W) Walk-on
- Injured
- Current redshirt

== Schedule ==
Date time, TV	Rank^{#}	Opponent^{#}	Result	Record	High points	High rebounds	High assists	Site (attendance) city, state
Exhibition
November 13, 1987; 7:00 pm		Ireland national team	W 99–96		24 – Rankin	14 – Cooper	7 – Lehman	Daskalakis Athletic Center; Philadelphia, PA
Regular season
November 28, 1986*		vs. Boston University; IPTAY Tournament semifinal	L 75–105	0–1	–	–	–	Littlejohn Coliseum (4,000); Clemson, SC
November 29, 1986*		vs. Georgia State; IPTAY Tournament 3rd place game	W 98–89	1–1	–	–	–	Littlejohn Coliseum (4,000); Clemson, SC
December 4, 1986*		at Temple	L 58–78	1–2	–	–	–	McGonigle Hall (2,894); Philadelphia, PA
December 6, 1986*; 2:00 pm		Saint Joseph's	L 67–82	1–3	–	–	–	Daskalakis Athletic Center (2,500); Philadelphia, PA
December 9, 1986*		at Long Island	W 91–71	2–3	–	–	–	Schwartz Athletic Center (523); New York, NY
December 23, 1986*		at Villanova	L 50–62	2–4	–	–	–	John Eleuthère du Pont Pavilion (6,500); Villanova, PA
December 29, 1986*		vs. Colorado State ? semifinal	L 81–87	2–5	–	–	–	Tulsa Convention Center (8,172); Tulsa, OK
December 30, 1986*		vs. William & Mary ? 3rd place game	W 60–58	3–5	–	–	–	Tulsa Convention Center (8,504); Tulsa, OK
Unknown*		at King's College (PA)	L 82–83	3–6	29 – Rankin	11 – Cooper	5 – Tied	(500)
January 7, 1987; 7:00 pm		Lafayette	W 90–85 ^{2OT}	4–6 (1–0)	32 – Anderson	15 – Anderson	5 – Lehmann	Daskalakis Athletic Center (1,357); Philadelphia, PA
January 10, 1987		at Bucknell	L 79–85	4–7 (1–1)	22 – Cooper	9 – Cooper	3 – Anderson	Davis Gym (2,075); Lewisburg, PA
January 17, 1987; 2:00 pm		Lehigh	W 76–74	5–7 (2–1)	–	–	–	Daskalakis Athletic Center (1,411); Philadelphia, PA
January 19, 1987*; 7:00 pm		Boston University	W 91–73	6–7	–	–	–	Daskalakis Athletic Center (1,026); Philadelphia, PA
January 21, 1987*; 6:00 pm		No. 18 Navy	W 83–80	7–7	23 – Cooper	10 – Anderson	–	Palestra (5,149); Philadelphia, PA
January 24, 1987; 2:00 pm		Bucknell	L 82–86	7–8 (2–2)	–	–	–	Daskalakis Athletic Center (1,215); Philadelphia, PA
January 28, 1987		at Rider	L 95–104	7–9 (2–3)	25 – Anderson	12 – Anderson	15 – Anderson	Alumni Gymnasium (1,245); Lawrenceville, NJ
January 31, 1987; 2:00 pm		Delaware	L 78–90	7–10 (2–4)	–	–	–	Daskalakis Athletic Center (1,072); Philadelphia, PA
February 2, 1987		Hofstra; Rescheduled from January 26	W 84–78	8–10 (3–4)	20 – Lehmann	–	–	Daskalakis Athletic Center (752); Philadelphia, PA
February 4, 1987; 7:00 pm		Towson State	W 94–81	9–10 (4–4)	25 – Cooper	10 – Cooper	–	Daskalakis Athletic Center (812); Philadelphia, PA
February 7, 1987		at Lafayette	L 64–79	9–11 (4–5)	–	–	–	Kirby Sports Center (2,159); Easton, PA
February 11, 1987		at Lehigh	W 70–67	10–11 (5–5)	–	–	–	Stabler Arena (1,500); Bethlehem, PA
February 14, 1987		at Hofstra	L 86–95	10–12 (5–6)	24 – Cooper	8 – Cooper	–	Physical Fitness Center (1,920); Hempstead, NY
February 16, 1987		at Towson State	W 94–81	11–12 (6–6)	29 – Rankin	7 – Cooper	7 – Anderson	Towson Center (845); Towson, MD
February 19, 1987*; 7:00 pm		William & Mary	W 82–76	12–12	–	–	–	Daskalakis Athletic Center (1,023); Philadelphia, PA
February 21, 1987; 2:00 pm		Rider	L 90–92	12–13 (6–7)	–	–	–	Daskalakis Athletic Center (1,051); Philadelphia, PA
February 25, 1987		at Delaware	W 86–75	13–13 (7–7)	26 – Rankin	14 – Cooper	5 – Anderson	Delaware Field House (1,194); Newark, DE
February 28, 1987*		at Central Connecticut State	W 74–73	14–13	–	–	–	Detrick Gymnasium (1,611); New Britain, CT
ECC Tournament
March 6, 1987	(5)	vs. (4) Lehigh	L 98–109 ^{2OT}	14–14	26 – Anderson	11 – Cooper	9 – Anderson	Towson Center (1,755); Towson, MD
*Non-conference game. ^{#}Rankings from AP. (#) Tournament seedings in parentheses. All times are in Eastern Time.

== Awards ==
Michael Anderson

- ECC All-Conference First Team
- Preseason ECC All-Conference First Team

Mike Joseph

- ECC All-Rookie Team

Todd Lehmann

- ECC All-Rookie Team

John Rankin

- Preseason ECC All-Conference First Team
