= 1986 East Coast Conference (Division I) men's basketball tournament =

- Classification: Division I
- Season: 1985–86
- Teams: 8
- Site: Towson Center; Towson, MD
- Champions: Drexel (1st title)
- Winning coach: Eddie Burke (1st title)
- MVP: Michael Anderson (Drexel)

1985–86 ECC men's basketball standings
| | Conf. | | | | Overall |
| Team | W | | L | PCT | W | | L | PCT |
|---|---|---|---|---|---|---|---|---|
| Drexel † | 11 | – | 3 | .786 | 19 | – | 12 | .613 |
| Hofstra | 9 | – | 5 | .643 | 17 | – | 13 | .567 |
| Bucknell | 8 | – | 6 | .571 | 17 | – | 12 | .586 |
| Lafayette | 8 | – | 6 | .571 | 14 | – | 15 | .483 |
| Lehigh | 6 | – | 8 | .429 | 13 | – | 15 | .464 |
| Rider | 5 | – | 9 | .357 | 9 | – | 19 | .321 |
| Towson State | 5 | – | 9 | .357 | 8 | – | 20 | .286 |
| Delaware | 4 | – | 10 | .286 | 11 | – | 16 | .407 |
† 1986 ECC tournament winner Rankings from AP poll

The 1986 East Coast Conference men's basketball tournament was held March 1–3, 1986. The champion gained and an automatic berth to the NCAA tournament.

== Bracket and results ==
Quarterfinals; Saturday, March 1
1 | Drexel | 99
8 | Delaware | 81
4 | Lafayette | 58
5 | Lehigh | 57
3 | Bucknell | 69
6 | Towson State | 54
2 | Hofstra | 77
7 | Rider | 68

Semifinals; Sunday, March 2
1 | Drexel | 78
4 | Lafayette | 69
3 | Bucknell | 66
2 | Hofstra | 68

Final; Monday, March 3
1 | Drexel | 80
2 | Hofstra | 76

== All-Tournament Team ==
- Leroy Allen, Hofstra
- Mark Allsteadt, Bucknell
- Michael Anderson, Drexel – Tournament MVP
- Luke Murphy, Hofstra
- John Rankin, Drexel
