= 1987 East Coast Conference (Division I) men's basketball tournament =

- Classification: Division I
- Season: 1986–87
- Teams: 8
- Site: Towson Center; Towson, MD
- Champions: Bucknell (1st title)
- Winning coach: Charlie Woollum (1st title)
- MVP: Chris Seneca (Bucknell)

1986–87 East Coast Conference men's basketball standings
	Conf.				Overall
Team	W		L	PCT	W		L	PCT
Bucknell †	11	–	3	.786	22	–	9	.710
Lafayette	10	–	4	.714	16	–	13	.552
Rider	8	–	6	.571	12	–	16	.429
Lehigh	8	–	6	.571	15	–	14	.517
Drexel	7	–	7	.500	14	–	14	.500
Towson State	5	–	9	.357	14	–	16	.467
Hofstra	4	–	10	.286	9	–	19	.321
Delaware	3	–	11	.214	12	–	16	.429
† 1987 ECC tournament winner Rankings from AP poll

The 1987 East Coast Conference men's basketball tournament was held March 6–8, 1987. The champion gained and an automatic berth to the NCAA tournament.

== Bracket and results ==
Quarterfinals; Friday, March 6
1	Bucknell	81
8	Delaware	71
4	Lehigh	109**
5	Drexel	98
3	Rider	79
6	Towson State	89
2	Lafayette	81
7	Hofstra	76

Semifinals; Saturday, March 7
1	Bucknell	103**
4	Lehigh	100
6	Towson	70
2	Lafayette	66

Final; Sunday, March 8
1	Bucknell	86
6	Towson	74

* denotes overtime game

== All-Tournament Team ==
- Mark Atkinson, Bucknell
- Marty Johnson, Towson State
- Mike Polaha, Lehigh
- Daren Queenan, Lehigh
- Chris Seneca, Bucknell – Tournament MVP
