= 1987–88 Drexel Dragons men's basketball team =

American college basketball season

1987–88 Drexel Dragons men's basketball
- Conference: East Coast Conference
- Record: 18–10 (9–5 ECC)
- Head coach: Eddie Burke (11th season)
- Assistant coach: Pat Flannery (4th season)
- MVP: Michael Anderson
- Captain: Michael Anderson
- Home arena: Daskalakis Athletic Center; Palestra (alternate, 3 games)

1987–88 East Coast Conference men's basketball standings
	Conf.				Overall
Team	W		L	PCT	W		L	PCT
Lafayette	11	–	3	.786	19	–	10	.655
Delaware	9	–	5	.643	19	–	9	.679
Drexel	9	–	5	.643	18	–	10	.643
Lehigh †	8	–	6	.571	21	–	10	.677
Bucknell	7	–	7	.500	16	–	12	.571
Rider	6	–	8	.429	10	–	19	.345
Towson State	4	–	10	.286	14	–	16	.467
Hofstra	2	–	12	.143	6	–	21	.222
† 1988 ECC tournament winner Rankings from AP poll

The 1987–88 Drexel Dragons men's basketball team represented Drexel University during the 1987–88 NCAA Division I men's basketball season. The Dragons, led by 11th year head coach Eddie Burke, played their home games at the Daskalakis Athletic Center (with the exception of 3 home games that were played at the Palestra) and were members of the East Coast Conference (ECC).

The team finished the season 18–10, and finished in 2nd place in the ECC in the regular season.

Drexel won their game against Manhattan via forfeit when Manhattah Head Coach Bob Delle Bovi took his team off the court to protest the officiating with 8:09 left to play in the second half. The recorded final score of 70–56 was the score at the time of the incident.

On January 6, 1988, John Rankin set the Drexel team record for most points in a single game, scoring 44 points against Rider. Later in the season, Michael Anderson scored 43 and 42 points in games against Lehigh and Rider respectively, which were the second and third highest scoring single game records in team history.

== Roster ==
1987–88 Drexel Dragons men's basketball team
Players
Coaches

Pos.	#	Name	Height	Weight	Year	Previous school	Hometown
F	3	John Rankin	6 ft 7 in (2.01 m)	—	Jr
G	10	Michael Anderson (C)	5 ft 11 in (1.8 m)	—	Sr	Carver HS	Philadelphia, PA
G	11	Todd Lehmann	5 ft 11 in (1.8 m)	—	So
G	14	Lou Bucchere	6 ft 0 in (1.83 m)	—	Fr
G	22	Chris Arizin	6 ft 5 in (1.96 m)	—	RS So
F	23	Jimmie Parker	6 ft 6 in (1.98 m)	—	Jr
F	30	Arthur Clark	6 ft 6 in (1.98 m)	—	Fr
F	32	Tom Murphy	6 ft 5 in (1.96 m)	—	Fr
F	33	Jim Hardy	6 ft 5 in (1.96 m)	—	So	Springfield HS	Morton, PA
C	34	Brian Raabe	6 ft 8 in (2.03 m)	245 lb (111 kg)	So
C	43	Rob Johnstone (injured)	6 ft 7 in (2.01 m)	—	RS Jr	New Canaan HS/Navy	New Canaan, Connecticut
F	45	Mike Staveski	6 ft 8 in (2.03 m)	—	Jr

Head coach

- Eddie Burke (La Salle)

Assistant coach(es)

- Pat Flannery (Bucknell)

Legend

- (C) Team captain
- (S) Suspended
- (I) Ineligible
- (W) Walk-on
- Injured
- Current redshirt

== Schedule ==
Date time, TV	Rank^{#}	Opponent^{#}	Result	Record	High points	High rebounds	High assists	Site (attendance) city, state
Regular season
November 30, 1987*; 7:00 pm		Liberty	W 99–82	1–0	37 – Anderson	10 – Anderson	12 – Anderson	Daskalakis Athletic Center (1,492); Philadelphia, PA
December 4, 1987*; 6:00 pm		vs. American; Manufacturers Hanover Classic semifinal	W 89–78	2–0	27 – Anderson	12 – Rankin	5 – Anderson	Hynes Athletic Center (2,111); New Rochelle, NY
December 5, 1987*		at Iona; Manufacturers Hanover Classic championship	W 99–82	3–0	24 – Rankin	10 – Rankin	6 – Lehmann	Hynes Athletic Center (2,169); New Rochelle, NY
December 13, 1987*; 7:00 pm		at Saint Joseph's	W 81–64	4–0	25 – Anderson	14 – Rankin	10 – Anderson	Palestra (3,262); Philadelphia, PA
December 18, 1987*		at California	L 74–89	4–1	22 – Anderson	6 – Anderson	7 – Anderson	Harmon Gym (6,450); Berkeley, CA
December 20, 1987*		vs. Houston; Spindletop Blowout Classic semifinals	L 88–91	4–2	26 – Anderson	11 – Anderson	7 – Anderson	Montagne Center (2,888); Beaumont, TX
December 21, 1988*		vs. Manhattan; Spindletop Blowout Classic consolation; Forfeited with 8:09 to play	W 70–56	5–2	22 – Lehmann	8 – Raabe	3 – Tied	Montagne Center (5,000); Beaumont, Texas
January 2, 1988*		vs. Saint Peter's; Naismith Classic semifinal	L 64–67	5–3	33 – Anderson	5 – Tied	7 – Anderson	Blake Arena (1,171); Springfield, MA
January 3, 1988*		vs. Colgate; Naismith Classic 3rd place game	W 59–56	6–3	27 – Lehmann	9 – Anderson	9 – Anderson	Blake Arena (700); Springfield, MA
January 6, 1988; 7:00 pm		Rider	W 104–92	7–3 (1–0)	44 – Rankin	13 – Rankin	12 – Anderson	Daskalakis Athletic Center (1,550); Philadelphia, PA
January 9, 1988*; 3:00 pm		Cornell	W 87–83	8–3	26 – Anderson	7 – Tied	8 – Lehmann	Daskalakis Athletic Center (2,087); Philadelphia, PA
January 13, 1988; 7:00 pm		Delaware	L 85–88	8–4 (1–1)	25 – Lehmann	13 – Rankin	9 – Anderson	Daskalakis Athletic Center (2,190); Philadelphia, PA
January 16, 1988; 7:00 pm		Towson State	W 93–62	9–4 (2–1)	18 – Rankin	7 – Tied	7 – Anderson	Palestra (2,671); Philadelphia, PA
January 19, 1988*; 9:00 pm		Marist	W 76–67	10–4	29 – Anderson	8 – Anderson	8 – Anderson	Palestra (7,179); Philadelphia, PA
January 21, 1988		at Lafayette	L 71–80	10–5 (2–2)	25 – Anderson	8 – Anderson	3 – Tied	Kirby Sports Center (1,439); Easton, PA
January 23, 1988		at Lehigh	W 91–85	11–5 (3–2)	43 – Anderson	8 – Murphy	6 – Anderson	Stabler Arena (4,125); Bethlehem, PA
January 25, 1988*; 7:00 pm		King's College (PA)	W 89–55	12–5	23 – Rankin	8 – Rankin	11 – Anderson	Daskalakis Athletic Center (755); Philadelphia, PA
January 27, 1988		at Hofstra	W 58–43	13–5 (4–2)	20 – Tied	13 – Rankin	7 – Anderson	Physical Fitness Center (1,293); Hempstead, NY
January 30, 1988		at Bucknell	W 104–92	14–5 (5–2)	36 – Rankin	12 – Rankin	7 – Anderson	Davis Gym (2,140); Lewisburg, PA
February 6, 1988; 3:15 pm		at Delaware	W 77–76	15–5 (6–2)	22 – Lehmann	8 – Tied	6 – Anderson	Delaware Field House (2,193); Newark, DE
February 10, 1988; 7:30 pm		at Towson State	L 64–74	15–6 (6–3)	19 – Rankin	7 – Tied	8 – Anderson	Towson Center (1,231); Towson, MD
February 13, 1988; 9:00 pm		Lafayette	W 55–48	16–6 (7–3)	20 – Lehmann	9 – Rankin	7 – Anderson	Palestra (5,209); Philadelphia, PA
February 17, 1988; 7:00 pm		Lehigh	W 94–86	17–6 (8–3)	35 – Anderson	9 – Anderson	7 – Lehmann	Daskalakis Athletic Center (3,000); Philadelphia, PA
February 20, 1988; 2:00 pm		Hofstra	W 86–56	18–6 (9–3)	21 – Anderson	8 – Rankin	9 – Lehmann	Daskalakis Athletic Center (1,382); Philadelphia, PA
February 22, 1988*; 7:30 pm		at Villanova	L 73–90	18–8	14 – Tied	9 – Arizin	3 – Tied	John Eleuthère du Pont Pavilion (6,500); Villanova, PA
February 24, 1988; 7:00 pm		Bucknell	L 89–98	18–9 (9–4)	36 – Anderson	13 – Rankin	7 – Anderson	Daskalakis Athletic Center (2,340); Philadelphia, PA
February 27, 1988; 8:00 pm		at Rider	L 90–97	18–9 (9–5)	42 – Anderson	7 – Tied	12 – Anderson	Alumni Gymnasium (1,988); Lawrenceville, NJ
ECC Tournament
March 5, 1988; 5:00 pm	(2)	at (7) Towson State; Quarterfinal	L 67–74	18–10	17 – Rankin	10 – Rankin	5 – Lehmann	Towson Center (1,214); Towson, MD
*Non-conference game. ^{#}Rankings from AP. (#) Tournament seedings in parentheses. All times are in Eastern Time.

== Awards ==
Michael Anderson

- ECC Player of the Year
- ECC All-Conference First Team
- United Press International All-American honorable mention
- Sporting News All-American honorable mention
- United States Basketball Writers All-District team
- Frances Pomeroy Naismith Award runner-up
- Preseason ECC All-Conference First Team

Tom Murphy

- ECC All-Rookie Team
- Lawrence Grassi Award (most improved player)

Todd Lehmann

- Donald Shank Spirit & Dedication Award

Brian Raabe

- Dragon "D" Award (team's top defensive player)

John Rankin

- ECC All-Conference Second Team
- "Sweep" Award (team leader in rebounds)
