= 1975–76 Drexel Dragons men's basketball team =

American college basketball season

1975–76 Drexel Dragons men's basketball

Baltimore Kiwanis Classic champions
- Conference: East Coast Conference
- East
- Record: 17–6 (3–2 ECC)
- Head coach: Ray Haesler (5th season)
- Assistant coaches: Mike Fee; Glenn Albano
- MVPs: Doug Romanczuk; Bob Stephens
- Captains: Doug Romanczuk; Mike Kernan
- Home arena: Physical Education Center

1975–76 ECC men's basketball standings
	Conf.				Overall
Team	W		L	PCT	W		L	PCT
East
Saint Joseph's	4	–	1	.800	10	–	16	.385
Hofstra †	3	–	2	.600	18	–	12	.600
Temple	3	–	2	.600	9	–	18	.333
Drexel	3	–	2	.600	17	–	6	.739
American	1	–	4	.200	9	–	16	.360
La Salle	1	–	4	.200	11	–	15	.423
West
Lafayette	9	–	1	.900	19	–	7	.731
Rider	6	–	4	.600	14	–	13	.519
Bucknell	5	–	5	.500	13	–	13	.500
Delaware	4	–	6	.400	10	–	15	.400
West Chester	4	–	6	.400	8	–	17	.320
Lehigh	2	–	8	.200	9	–	15	.375
† 1976 ECC tournament winner Rankings from AP Poll

The 1975–76 Drexel Dragons men's basketball team represented Drexel University during the 1975–76 men's basketball season. The Dragons, led by 5th year head coach Ray Haesler, played their home games at the Daskalakis Athletic Center and were members of the East Coast Conference (ECC).

In a game against Ursinus on February 11, 1976, Drexel set team records for both team shooting percentage (63.4%) and margin of victory (51).

The team finished the season 17–6, and finished in 2nd place in the ECC East in the regular season.

== Roster ==
1975–76 Drexel Dragons men's basketball team
Players
Coaches

Pos.	#	Name	Height	Weight	Year	Previous school	Hometown
F	14	Randy Barnes	6 ft 3 in (1.91 m)	—	Jr	Dobbins HS	Philadelphia, PA
G	15	Ray James	6 ft 0 in (1.83 m)	—	So	Asbury Park HS	Asbury Park, NJ
G/F	21	Tom Betley	6 ft 3 in (1.91 m)	—	So	Haddonfield Memorial HS	Haddonfield, NJ
G	22	Joe Conahan	6 ft 1 in (1.85 m)	—	So	North Catholic HS	Philadelphia, PA
F	23	Mike Kernan (C)	6 ft 6 in (1.98 m)	—	Sr	North Catholic HS	Philadelphia, PA
C	25	Doug White	6 ft 6 in (1.98 m)	—	RS Sr	Eastern HS	Ashland, NJ
F/C	33	Tony Weldon	6 ft 6 in (1.98 m)	—	So	Germantown Stevens	Philadelphia, PA
F	42	Doug Romanczuk (C)	6 ft 5 in (1.96 m)	—	Sr	North Catholic HS	Philadelphia, PA
C	43	Bob Stephens	6 ft 7 in (2.01 m)	—	Fr	Olney HS	Philadelphia, PA
G		Brian O'Loughlin	5 ft 11 in (1.8 m)	—	Fr

Head coach

- Ray Haesler (Rider)

Assistant coach(es)

- Mike Fee (Drexel)
- Glenn Albano (Rider)

Legend

- (C) Team captain
- (S) Suspended
- (I) Ineligible
- (W) Walk-on
- Injured
- Current redshirt

== Schedule ==
Date time, TV	Rank^{#}	Opponent^{#}	Result	Record	High points	High rebounds	High assists	Site (attendance) city, state
Exhibition
November 15, 1975; 10:30 am		Cheyney State	W 65–63		–	–	–	Physical Education Center; Philadelphia, PA
November 22, 1975		at George Washington						
Regular season
November 29, 1975*		at Princeton	L 48–67	0–1	17 – Stephens	12 – Stephens	2 – Kernan	Jadwin Gymnasium (2,002); Princeton, NJ
Unknown*		at Widener	W 70–64 ^{2OT}	1–1	20 – Stephens	15 – Stephens	–	Chester, PA
December 6, 1975*		at Delaware	L 60–61	1–2	16 – Romanczuk	19 – Romanczuk	–	Delaware Field House; Newark, DE
December 9, 1975*		Long Island; First game at Physical Education Center	L 67–69	1–3	16 – James	–	–	Physical Education Center; Philadelphia, PA
December 20, 1975*		West Chester	W 93–71	2–3	23 – Kernan	–	–	Physical Education Center; Philadelphia, PA
December 29, 1975*		vs. Howard; Baltimore Kiwanis Classic semifinal	W 74–66	3–3	23 – Stephens	16 – Stephens	–	Baltimore Civic Center; Baltimore, MD
December 30, 1975*		at Morgan State; Baltimore Kiwanis Classic championship	W 62–54	4–3	21 – Stephens	–	–	Baltimore Civic Center; Baltimore, MD
January 3, 1976*		Rider	W 64–61	5–3	17 – James	–	10 – James	Physical Education Center; Philadelphia, PA
January 13, 1976; 7:15 pm, PHL-17		at La Salle	W 74–66	6–3 (1–0)	22 – Kernan	14 – Stephens	6 – Conahan	Palestra (2,671); Philadelphia, PA
January 17, 1976*		at Gettysburg	W 66–50	7–3	18 – Kernan	–	–	Bream Gym; Gettysburg, PA
January 20, 1976*		at Swarthmore	W 72–49	8–3	18 – Kernan	–	–	
January 22, 1976*		Lehigh	W 69–53	9–3	16 – Stephens	–	–	Physical Education Center; Philadelphia, PA
January 24, 1976; 2:15 pm		Hofstra	L 62–63	9–4	23 – Kernan	–	–	Physical Education Center; Philadelphia, PA
January 26, 1976*; 8:00 pm		Bucknell	W 61–55	10–4	14 – Stephens	12 – Stephens	–	Physical Education Center; Philadelphia, PA
January 29, 1976*; 8:00 pm		Wagner	W 76–56	11–4	16 – 2 Tied	–	–	Physical Education Center; Philadelphia, PA
February 6, 1976; 9:15 pm		vs. Saint Joseph's	W 67–66	12–4 (2–1)	21 – James	12 – Romanczuk	–	Palestra (4,883); Philadelphia, PA
February 11, 1976*		at Ursinus	W 103–52	13–4	23 – Stephens	–	–	
February 14, 1976*		Iona	W 67–62	14–4	22 – Romanczuk	12 – Stephens	–	Physical Education Center; Philadelphia, PA
February 16, 1976		American	W 55–42	15–4 (3–1)	18 – James	24 – Stephens	–	Physical Education Center; Philadelphia, PA
February 18, 1976*		No. 1 (DII) Philadelphia Textile	L 50–68	15–5	12 – James	–	–	Physical Education Center; Philadelphia, PA
February 21, 1976*		Albright	W 76–58	16–5	–	– Stephens	12 – Conahan	Physical Education Center; Philadelphia, PA
February 25, 1976*		at Glassboro State	W 54–53	17–5	16 – Stephens	–	–	
February 28, 1976; 5:15 pm		vs. Temple	L 54–58	17–6 (3–2)	–	–	–	Palestra; Philadelphia, PA
*Non-conference game. ^{#}Rankings from AP. (#) Tournament seedings in parentheses. All times are in Eastern Time.

== Awards ==
Ray Haesler

- ECC Coach of the Year

Doug Romanczuk

- Baltimore Kiwanis Classic MVP

Bob Stephens

- Converse Honorable Mention All-American
- Herb Good Sportswriters Society All-Philadelphia Area Team
- ECC Co-Rookie of the Year
- ECC All-Conference Second Team
- Leading Freshman Rebounder in NCAA Division I
