= 1971–72 Drexel Dragons men's basketball team =

American college basketball season

1971–72 Drexel Dragons men's basketball
- Conference: Middle Atlantic Conferences
- University–Eastern
- Record: 11–14 (2–4 MAC)
- Head coach: Ray Haesler (1st season)
- Captain: Steve Lilly
- Home arena: 32nd Street Armory

1971–72 MAC men's basketball standings
	Conf.				Overall
Team	W		L	PCT	W		L	PCT
University–Eastern
Temple †	6	–	0	1.000	23	–	8	.742
Saint Joseph's	5	–	1	.833	19	–	9	.679
American	3	–	3	.500	16	–	8	.667
Hofstra	2	–	4	.333	11	–	14	.440
Drexel	2	–	4	.333	11	–	14	.440
La Salle	2	–	4	.333	6	–	19	.240
West Chester	1	–	5	.167	9	–	16	.360
University–Western
Rider	8	–	2	.800	15	–	11	.577
Lafayette	7	–	3	.700	20	–	5	.800
Delaware	7	–	3	.700	18	–	7	.720
Lehigh	3	–	7	.300	10	–	14	.417
Bucknell	3	–	7	.300	5	–	18	.217
Gettysburg	2	–	8	.200	11	–	12	.478
† 1972 MAC men's basketball tournament winner Rankings from AP Poll

The 1971–72 Drexel Dragons men's basketball team represented Drexel University during the 1971–72 men's basketball season. The Dragons, led by first year head coach Ray Haesler, played their home games at the 32nd Street Armory and were members of the University–Eastern division of the Middle Atlantic Conferences (MAC).

The team finished the season 11–14, and finished in 4th place in the MAC University–Eastern Division in the regular season.

On January 5, 1972, Steve Lilly set the Drexel team record for most rebounds in a single game, recording 30 rebounds against Muhlenberg. He also set Drexel records at the time for rebounds in a season (327) and career (749).

== Roster ==
1971–72 Drexel Dragons men's basketball team
Players
Coaches

Pos.	#	Name	Height	Weight	Year	Previous school	Hometown
F		Steve Lilly	6 ft 4 in (1.93 m)	—	Sr
			—	—

Head coach

- Ray Haesler (Rider)

Assistant coach(es)

Legend

- (C) Team captain
- (S) Suspended
- (I) Ineligible
- (W) Walk-on
- Injured
- Current redshirt

== Schedule ==
Date time, TV	Rank^{#}	Opponent^{#}	Result	Record	High points	High rebounds	High assists	Site (attendance) city, state
Regular season
Unknown*		Delaware Valley	W 67–63	1–0	–	–	–	32nd Street Armory; Philadelphia, PA
Unknown*		vs. West Virginia Tech; Washington and Lee Invitational semifinal	W 74–63	2–0	–	–	–	Lexington, VA
Unknown*		at Washington and Lee; Washington and Lee Invitational championship	W 86–72	3–0	–	–	–	Lexington, VA
December 6, 1971		American	L 56–85	3–1 (0–1)	–	–	–	32nd Street Armory; Philadelphia, PA
Unknown*		at Pennsylvania Military College	L 53–69	3–2	–	–	–	
Unknown*		Lehigh	L 72–74	3–3	–	–	–	32nd Street Armory; Philadelphia, PA
Unknown*		at Albright; Albright College Invitational semifinal	L 67–79	3–4	–	–	–	
Unknown*		vs. Williams; Albright College Invitational 3rd place	L 88–89 ^{OT}	3–5	–	–	–	
January 5, 1972*		Muhlenberg	W 93–75	4–5	–	30 – Lilly	–	32nd Street Armory; Philadelphia, PA
Unknown		West Chester	L 61–64	4–6 (0–2)	–	–	–	
January 11, 1972*		at Swarthmore	W 67–58	5–6	–	–	–	
Unknown*		Moravian	W 84–57	6–6	–	–	–	32nd Street Armory; Philadelphia, PA
January 18, 1972		at Saint Joseph's	L 64–87	6–7 (0–3)	–	–	–	(2,100)
January 22, 1972*		at Gettysburg	L 68–77	6–8	–	–	–	Bream Gym; Gettysburg, PA
January 26, 1972*		at Bucknell	W 68–63	7–8	–	–	–	
Unknown*		Rider	L 80–88	7–9	–	–	–	
Unknown		Temple	L 46–53	7–10 (0–4)	–	–	–	
February 5, 1972*		Johns Hopkins	W 89–64	8–10	–	–	–	32nd Street Armory; Philadelphia, PA
February 7, 1972; 8:00 pm		La Salle	W 77–64	9–10 (1–4)	–	–	–	32nd Street Armory; Philadelphia, PA
Unknown*		Delaware	L 67–75	9–11	–	–	–	
Unknown*		Ursinus	W 68–59	10–11	–	–	–	
Unknown*		Philadelphia Textile	L 62–82	10–12	–	–	–	
Unknown		Hofstra	W 69–64	11–12 (2–4)	–	–	–	
Unknown*		Delaware	L 56–94	11–13	–	–	–	
Unknown*		at Franklin & Marshall	L 51–68	11–14	–	–	–	
*Non-conference game. ^{#}Rankings from AP. (#) Tournament seedings in parentheses. All times are in Eastern Time.
