= 1973–74 Drexel Dragons men's basketball team =

American college basketball season

1973–74 Drexel Dragons men's basketball

Merrimack Christmas Tournament champions
- Conference: Middle Atlantic Conferences
- University–Eastern
- Record: 15–9 (2–4 MAC)
- Head coach: Ray Haesler (3rd season)
- MVP: Greg Newman
- Captains: Francis Korwek; Greg Newman
- Home arena: 32nd Street Armory

1973–74 MAC men's basketball standings
	Conf.				Overall
Team	W		L	PCT	W		L	PCT
University–Eastern
Saint Joseph's †	5	–	1	.833	19	–	10	.655
La Salle	5	–	1	.833	18	–	10	.643
American	4	–	2	.667	16	–	10	.615
Temple	4	–	2	.667	16	–	9	.640
Drexel	2	–	4	.333	15	–	9	.625
Hofstra	1	–	5	.167	8	–	16	.333
West Chester	0	–	6	.000	11	–	15	.423
University–Western
Rider	8	–	2	.800	13	–	13	.500
Lafayette	7	–	3	.700	17	–	9	.654
Delaware	7	–	3	.700	15	–	11	.577
Gettysburg	4	–	6	.400	15	–	10	.600
Bucknell	2	–	8	.200	8	–	16	.333
Lehigh	2	–	8	.200	3	–	21	.125
† 1974 MAC men's basketball tournament winner Rankings from AP Poll

The 1973–74 Drexel Dragons men's basketball team represented Drexel University during the 1973–74 men's basketball season. The Dragons, led by 3rd year head coach Ray Haesler, played their home games at the 32nd Street Armory and were members of the university–Eastern division of the Middle Atlantic Conferences (MAC).

The team finished the season 15–9, and finished in 5th place in the MAC University–Eastern Division in the regular season.

Drexel won the Merrimack Christmas Tournament in December. On February 6, 1974, Greg Newman set the Drexel team record for most points in a single game, scoring 40 points against Franklin & Marshall.

== Roster ==
1973–74 Drexel Dragons men's basketball team
Players
Coaches

Pos.	#	Name	Height	Weight	Year	Previous school	Hometown
		Greg Newman	6 ft 3 in (1.91 m)	—	Sr
F	42	Doug Romanczuk	6 ft 4 in (1.93 m)	—	So	North Catholic HS	Philadelphia, PA
G		Mike Feagans	6 ft 3 in (1.91 m)	—	Jr
F	23	Mike Kernan	6 ft 5 in (1.96 m)	—	So	North Catholic HS	Philadelphia, PA
F		Terry Parks	6 ft 4 in (1.93 m)	—	Jr
F		Francis Korwek	6 ft 5 in (1.96 m)	—	Sr	Archmere Academy
F		Tim Corlies	6 ft 4 in (1.93 m)	—	Jr	St. Joseph's Prep
C		Doug White	6 ft 6 in (1.98 m)	—	Jr	Eastern HS	Ashland, NJ
G		Steve Rawlings	6 ft 2 in (1.88 m)	—	Fr	Upper Darby HS
G		Bob Ambler	5 ft 11 in (1.8 m)	—	Jr
G		Jim Brophy	5 ft 11 in (1.8 m)	—	So
C		Ed Tompkins	6 ft 6 in (1.98 m)	—	Sr
G		Charlie O'Donnell	6 ft 4 in (1.93 m)	—	Jr
G		Dave Williams	6 ft 2 in (1.88 m)	—	Sr

Head coach

- Ray Haesler (Rider)

Assistant coach(es)

Legend

- (C) Team captain
- (S) Suspended
- (I) Ineligible
- (W) Walk-on
- Injured
- Current redshirt

== Schedule ==
Date time, TV	Rank^{#}	Opponent^{#}	Result	Record	High points	High rebounds	High assists	Site (attendance) city, state
Regular season
December 1, 1973*; 8:15 pm		at Widener	L 50–61	0–1	17 – Newman	15 – Romanczuk	–	Chester, PA
Unknown*		at East Stroudsburg	L 55–56	0–2	14 – Newman	9 – 2 Tied	–	
December 15, 1973*		Wagner	W 63–57	1–2	12 – 2 Tied	16 – Korwek	–	32nd Street Armory; Philadelphia, PA
December 19, 1973*		at Glassboro State	L 52–55	1–3	17 – Parks	9 – Korwek	–	
December 21, 1973		vs. Bridgeport; Merrimack Christmas Tournament semifinal	W 69–64	2–3	26 – Newman	10 – Corlies	–	North Andover, MA
December 22, 1973*		at Merrimack; Merrimack Christmas Tournament championship	W 103–85	3–3	23 – Newman	10 – Kernan	–	North Andover, MA
January 3, 1974*		at Delaware	L 70–78	3–4	17 – Kernan	6 – Korwek	–	
January 5, 1975*		Rider	W 70–50	4–4	18 – Newman	12 – Newman	–	32nd Street Armory; Philadelphia, PA
January 9, 1974*		at Swarthmore	W 75–57	5–4	21 – Newman	14 – Romanczuk	–	
January 10, 1974*		Lehigh	W 73–41	6–4	15 – Newman	11 – Parks	–	32nd Street Armory; Philadelphia, PA
January 12, 1974*		Bucknell	L 49–52	6–5	18 – Newman	10 – Newman	–	32nd Street Armory; Philadelphia, PA
January 16, 1974; 7:05 pm		at La Salle	L 73–85	6–6 (0–1)	22 – Newman	10 – Newman	–	Palestra; Philadelphia, PA
January 19, 1974*		at Gettysburg	W 75–60	7–6	20 – Newman	15 – Parks	–	Bream Gym; Gettysburg, PA
January 21, 1974		at Saint Joseph's	L 50–78	7–7 (0–2)	15 – Newman	10 – Romanczuk	–	(2,350)
January 23, 1974; 8:00 pm		West Chester	W 72–64	8–7 (1–2)	22 – Newman	14 – Kernan	–	32nd Street Armory; Philadelphia, PA
January 26, 1974*; 7:00 pm		vs. Colegate	W 55–44	9–7	15 – 2 Tied	9 – 3 Tied	–	Palestra; Philadelphia, PA
March 1, 1975		Temple	L 43–55	9–8 (1–3)	12 – Kernan	5 – Kernan	–	32nd Street Armory; Philadelphia, PA
February 2, 1974*		Johns Hopkins	W 57–55	10–8	23 – Newman	10 – Parks	–	32nd Street Armory; Philadelphia, PA
February 6, 1974		American	L 62–69	10–9 (1–4)	27 – Newman	11 – Parks	–	32nd Street Armory; Philadelphia, PA
February 9, 1974		at Hofstra	W 101–92	11–9 (2–4)	25 – 2 Tied	9 – Kernan	–	32nd Street Armory; Philadelphia, PA
Unknown*		at Ursinus	W 78–54	12–9	25 – Newman	10 – Kernan	–	
February 16, 1974*		at Franklin & Marshall	W 78–63	13–9	40 – Newman	15 – Romanczuk	–	
February 20, 1974*		Philadelphia Textile	W 69–64	14–9	27 – Newman	9 – Korwek	–	32nd Street Armory; Philadelphia, PA
Unknown*		Albright	W 72–62	15–9	17 – Kernan	11 – Romanczuk	–	32nd Street Armory; Philadelphia, PA
*Non-conference game. ^{#}Rankings from AP. (#) Tournament seedings in parentheses. All times are in Eastern Time.
