= 1988–89 Drexel Dragons men's basketball team =

American college basketball season

1988–89 Drexel Dragons men's basketball
- Conference: East Coast Conference
- Record: 12–16 (7–7 ECC)
- Head coach: Eddie Burke (12th season)
- Assistant coaches: Pat Flannery (5th season); Walton Fuller (1st season)
- Home arena: Daskalakis Athletic Center

1988–89 East Coast Conference men's basketball standings
	Conf.				Overall
Team	W		L	PCT	W		L	PCT
Bucknell †	11	–	3	.786	23	–	8	.742
Towson State	10	–	4	.714	19	–	10	.655
Lafayette	8	–	6	.571	20	–	10	.667
Hofstra	7	–	7	.500	14	–	15	.483
Drexel	7	–	7	.500	12	–	16	.429
Delaware	6	–	8	.429	14	–	14	.500
Lehigh	5	–	9	.357	10	–	18	.357
Rider	2	–	12	.143	5	–	23	.179
† 1989 ECC tournament winner Rankings from AP poll

The 1988–89 Drexel Dragons men's basketball team represented Drexel University during the 1988–89 NCAA Division I men's basketball season. The Dragons, led by 11th year head coach Eddie Burke, played their home games at the Daskalakis Athletic Center and were members of the East Coast Conference (ECC).

The team finished the season 12–16, and finished in 4th place in the ECC in the regular season.

== Roster ==
1988–89 Drexel Dragons men's basketball team
Players	Coaches
Pos. / # / Name / Height / Weight / Year / Previous school / Hometown; / / / — / —	Head coach: Eddie Burke (La Salle); Assistant coach(es): Pat Flannery (Bucknell); Walton Fuller (Drexel); Legend: (C) Team captain; (S) Suspended; (I) Ineligible; (W) Walk-on; Injured; Current redshirt

== Schedule ==
Date time, TV	Rank^{#}	Opponent^{#}	Result	Record	High points	High rebounds	High assists	Site (attendance) city, state
Regular season
November 30, 1988*		vs. Saint Joseph's	L 77–89	0–1	–	–	–	Palestra (3,562); Philadelphia, PA
December 2, 1988*		at Western Kentucky	L 81–105	0–2	–	–	–	(4,000)
December 3, 1988*		vs. Tulsa	L 65–81	0–3	–	–	–	E. A. Diddle Arena (4,000); Bowling Green, KY
December 9, 1988*		Long Beach State	L 84–92	0–4	–	–	–	Daskalakis Athletic Center (5,921); Philadelphia, PA
December 10, 1988*		at Penn; Josten's Classic, Battle of 33rd Street	W 70–69	1–4	–	–	–	Palestra (4,144); Philadelphia, PA
December 13, 1988*		at Villanova	L 78–89	1–5	–	–	–	(6,500)
December 16, 1988*		vs. Ohio; Walsworth Show-Me Classic	L 70–98	1–6	–	–	–	Hearnes Center (12,408); Columbia, MO
December 17, 1988*		vs. Eastern Washington; Walsworth Show-Me Classic	W 79–71	2–6	–	–	–	Hearnes Center (12,522); Columbia, MO
December 28, 1988*		vs. Howard	W 78–71	3–6	–	–	–	Knott Arena (1,800); Emmitsburg, MD
December 29, 1988*		at Mount St. Mary's	W 86–76	4–6	–	–	–	Knott Arena (2,200); Emmitsburg, MD
January 7, 1989*		at Cornell	W 91–84	5–6	–	–	–	(1,000)
January 11, 1989		at Delaware	W 78–69	6–6 (1–0)	–	–	–	Delaware Field House; Newark, DE
January 14, 1989		Towson	L 73–75	6–7 (1–1)	–	–	–	Daskalakis Athletic Center; Philadelphia, PA
January 18, 1989; 8:00 p.m.		at Bucknell	L 77–79	6–8 (1–2)	–	–	–	Davis Gym (2,137); Lewisburg, PA
January 21, 1989		Hofstra	W 58–56	7–8 (2–2)	–	–	–	Daskalakis Athletic Center; Philadelphia, PA
January 25, 1989		at Lafayette	W 76–70	8–8 (3–2)	–	–	–	Allan P. Kirby Field House (2,433); Easton, PA
January 28, 1989		at Lehigh	L 92–94 ^{2OT}	8–9 (3–3)	–	–	–	Stabler Arena (2,323); Bethlehem, PA
February 1, 1989		Rider	W 85–66	9–9 (4–3)	–	–	–	Daskalakis Athletic Center; Philadelphia, PA
February 4, 1989		Delaware	W 88–79	10–9 (5–3)	–	–	–	Daskalakis Athletic Center; Philadelphia, PA
February 8, 1989		at Towson	L 72–106	10–10 (5–4)	–	–	–	
February 11, 1989; 2:00 p.m.		Bucknell	W 88–65	11–10 (6–4)	–	–	–	Daskalakis Athletic Center (2,310); Philadelphia, PA
February 15, 1989		at Hofstra	L 68–71	11–11 (6–5)	–	–	–	
February 18, 1989		Lafayette	L 63–70	11–12 (6–6)	–	–	–	Daskalakis Athletic Center (2,000); Philadelphia, PA
February 20, 1989*		at Marist	L 70–80	11–13	–	–	–	
February 22, 1989		Lehigh	L 83–88	11–14 (6–7)	–	–	–	Daskalakis Athletic Center (8,722); Philadelphia, PA
February 25, 1989*		at Liberty	L 79–82	11–15	–	–	–	
February 27, 1989		at Rider	W 88–76	12–15 (7–7)	–	–	–	
ECC Tournament
March 4, 1989	(5)	vs. (4) Hofstra; Quarterfinal	L 73–79	12–16	–	–	–	Towson Center; Towson, MD
*Non-conference game. ^{#}Rankings from AP. (#) Tournament seedings in parentheses. All times are in Eastern Time.

== Awards ==
John Rankin

- ECC All-Conference First Team

Todd Lehmann

- ECC All-Conference Second Team
