= 1976–77 Drexel Dragons men's basketball team =

American college basketball season

1976–77 Drexel Dragons men's basketball

Albright College Invitational Tournament champions
- Conference: East Coast Conference
- East
- Record: 11–13 (0–5 ECC)
- Head coach: Ray Haesler (6th season)
- MVP: Bob Stephens
- Home arena: Daskalakis Athletic Center

1976–77 ECC men's basketball standings
	Conf.				Overall
Team	W		L	PCT	W		L	PCT
East
Temple	4	–	1	.800	17	–	11	.607
Hofstra †	4	–	1	.800	23	–	7	.767
La Salle	3	–	2	.600	17	–	12	.586
Saint Joseph's	2	–	3	.400	13	–	13	.500
American	2	–	3	.400	13	–	13	.500
Drexel	0	–	5	.000	11	–	13	.458
West
Lafayette	9	–	1	.900	21	–	6	.778
Delaware	7	–	3	.700	12	–	13	.480
Lehigh	6	–	4	.600	12	–	15	.444
Bucknell	5	–	5	.500	10	–	15	.400
West Chester	2	–	8	.200	11	–	14	.440
Rider	1	–	9	.100	8	–	18	.308
† 1977 ECC tournament winner Rankings from AP Poll

The 1976–77 Drexel Dragons men's basketball team represented Drexel University during the 1976–77 men's basketball season. The Dragons, led by 6th year head coach Ray Haesler, played their home games at the Daskalakis Athletic Center and were members of the East Coast Conference (ECC).

The team finished the season 11–13, and finished in 6th place in the ECC East in the regular season.

== Roster ==
1976–77 Drexel Dragons men's basketball team
Players	Coaches
Pos. / # / Name / Height / Weight / Year / Previous school / Hometown; / / / — / —	Head coach: Ray Haesler (Rider); Assistant coach(es) Legend: (C) Team captain; (S) Suspended; (I) Ineligible; (W) Walk-on; Injured; Current redshirt

== Schedule ==
Date time, TV	Rank^{#}	Opponent^{#}	Result	Record	High points	High rebounds	High assists	Site (attendance) city, state
Regular season
Unknown*		Glassboro State	W 75–74	1–0	–	–	–	Daskalakis Athletic Center (1,200); Philadelphia, PA
December 2, 1976*		Delaware	W 78–77	2–0	–	22 – Stephens	–	Daskalakis Athletic Center (1,000); Philadelphia, PA
December 4, 1976*		Siena	W 68–59	3–0	–	–	–	Daskalakis Athletic Center (600); Philadelphia, PA
December 7, 1976*		at Long Island	W 72–57	4–0	–	–	–	(250)
December 16, 1976*		at Rutgers	L 68–83	4–1	–	–	–	(2,700)
Unknown*		vs. Amherst; Albright Tournament semifinal	W 69–63	5–1	–	–	–	Bollman Center (500); Reading, PA
Unknown*		at Albright; Albright Tournament championship	W 96–66	6–1	–	–	–	Bollman Center (1,000); Reading, PA
January 4, 1977*		at Rider	L 58–63	6–2	–	–	–	(500)
January 8, 1977*		at West Chester	L 50–62	6–3	–	–	–	(500)
January 12, 1977; 8:00 pm		La Salle	L 51–55	6–4 (0–1)	–	–	–	Daskalakis Athletic Center (1,800); Philadelphia, PA
January 15, 1977*		Gettysburg	W 79–59	7–4	–	–	–	Daskalakis Athletic Center (750); Philadelphia, PA
January 17, 1977*		at Bucknell	W 70–63	8–4	–	–	–	(500)
January 20, 1977*		at Lehigh	W 63–58	9–4	–	–	–	(500)
January 22, 1977		at Hofstra	L 70–76	9–5 (0–2)	–	–	–	(1,500)
January 26, 1977		at American	L 72–79	9–6 (0–3)	–	–	–	(500)
January 29, 1977*		vs. Catholic University	L 70–83	9–7	–	–	–	Palestra (2,900); Philadelphia, PA
February 2, 1977*		Fairleigh Dickinson	L 48–54	9–8	–	–	–	Daskalakis Athletic Center (500); Philadelphia, PA
Unknown*		Widener	W 49–46 ^{OT}	10–8	–	–	–	Daskalakis Athletic Center (1,000); Philadelphia, PA
February 9, 1977		Saint Joseph's	L 53–62	10–9 (0–4)	–	–	–	Daskalakis Athletic Center (1,904); Philadelphia, PA
February 12, 1977*		at Iona	L 62–69	10–10	–	–	–	(1,500)
Unknown*		at Philadelphia Textile	L 38–62	10–11	–	–	–	(1,500)
February 19, 1977*		at Temple	L 58–61	10–12	–	–	–	(700)
February 23, 1977*		at Wagner	W 64–63	11–12	–	–	–	(250)
February 26, 1977*		at Northeastern	L 52–60	11–13	–	–	–	(250)
*Non-conference game. ^{#}Rankings from AP. (#) Tournament seedings in parentheses. All times are in Eastern Time.

== Awards ==
Bob Stephens

- Converse Honorable Mention All-American
- Sporting News Honorable Mention All-American
- Herb Good Sportswriters Society All-Philadelphia Area Team
- ECC All-Conference Second Team
- Albright College Invitational Tournament MVP
- Albright College Invitational All-Tournament Team
