= 1985–86 Drexel Dragons men's basketball team =

American college basketball season

1985–86 Drexel Dragons men's basketball

ECC Regular Season Champions ECC Tournament Champions

NCAA tournament first round, L 73–93
- Conference: East Coast Conference
- Record: 19–12 (11–3 ECC)
- Head coach: Eddie Burke (9th season)
- Assistant coaches: Pat Flannery (3rd season); Joe Cassidy
- MVPs: Walton Fuller; Michael Anderson
- Captains: Walter Fuller; Chris O'Brien
- Home arena: Daskalakis Athletic Center

1985–86 ECC men's basketball standings
	Conf.				Overall
Team	W		L	PCT	W		L	PCT
Drexel †	11	–	3	.786	19	–	12	.613
Hofstra	9	–	5	.643	17	–	13	.567
Bucknell	8	–	6	.571	17	–	12	.586
Lafayette	8	–	6	.571	14	–	15	.483
Lehigh	6	–	8	.429	13	–	15	.464
Rider	5	–	9	.357	9	–	19	.321
Towson State	5	–	9	.357	8	–	20	.286
Delaware	4	–	10	.286	11	–	16	.407
† 1986 ECC tournament winner Rankings from AP poll

The 1985–86 Drexel Dragons men's basketball team represented Drexel University during the 1985–86 NCAA Division I men's basketball season. The Dragons, led by 9th year head coach Eddie Burke, played their home games at the Daskalakis Athletic Center and were members of the East Coast Conference (ECC).

The team finished the season 19–12, and finished in 1st place in the ECC in the regular season.

In the 1985–86 season, sophomore guard Michael Anderson set the school records at the time for both assists and steals in a season, recording 225 assists and 92 steals.

In the season opener against Villanova, Anderson also set the school record for most free throws attempted in a game, with 24.

On December 15, 1985, in their game against Coppin State, the team set a school record for most steals in a game as a team with 19 steals.

== Roster ==
1985–86 Drexel Dragons men's basketball team
Players
Coaches

Pos.	#	Name	Height	Weight	Year	Previous school	Hometown
G	10	Michael Anderson	5 ft 11 in (1.8 m)	—	So	Carver HS	Philadelphia, PA
C	30	John Rankin	6 ft 7 in (2.01 m)	—	Fr
G	22	Walton Fuller (C)	6 ft 2 in (1.88 m)	—	Sr	Monsignor Bonner HS	Philadelphia, PA
F	32	Casper Cooper	6 ft 4 in (1.93 m)	—	Jr
G	4	Chris O'Brien (C)	5 ft 11 in (1.8 m)	—	Sr
G	11	Troy Stribling	5 ft 11 in (1.8 m)	—	Jr
F	33	Pat Rafferty	6 ft 6 in (1.98 m)	—	Jr
F	44	Mike Staveski	6 ft 8 in (2.03 m)	—	Fr
F	43	Rick Papes	6 ft 7 in (2.01 m)	—	Jr
G	14	Chris Arizin	6 ft 4 in (1.93 m)	—	Fr
F	23	Jimmie Parker	6 ft 6 in (1.98 m)	—	Fr
C		Rob Johnstone (redshirt)	6 ft 7 in (2.01 m)	—	So	New Canaan HS/Navy	New Canaan, Connecticut

Head coach

- Eddie Burke (La Salle)

Assistant coach(es)

- Pat Flannery (Bucknell)
- Joe Cassidy

Legend

- (C) Team captain
- (S) Suspended
- (I) Ineligible
- (W) Walk-on
- Injured
- Current redshirt

== Schedule ==
Date time, TV	Rank^{#}	Opponent^{#}	Result	Record	High points	High rebounds	High assists	Site (attendance) city, state
Regular season
November 22, 1985*		at Villanova	L 51–66	0–1	20 – Anderson	–	–	John Eleuthère du Pont Pavilion (3,200); Villanova, PA
November 26, 1985*		Temple	L 51–64	0–2	20 – Fuller	–	–	Daskalakis Athletic Center (2,417); Philadelphia, PA
November 30, 1985*		at William & Mary	L 52–57	0–3	–	11 – Anderson	10 – Anderson	William & Mary Hall (1,097); Williamsburg, VA
December 2, 1985*		Niagara	L 67–70	0–4	–	–	–	Daskalakis Athletic Center (516); Philadelphia, PA
December 4, 1985*		Long Island	W 98–82	1–4	27 – Rankin	–	–	Daskalakis Athletic Center (682); Philadelphia, PA
December 1985*		vs. Central Connecticut State; Pepsi–Pouohkeepsie Classic semifinals	L 64–65	1–5	–	–	–	McCann Field House (1,713); Poughkeepsie, NY
December 15, 1985*		vs. Coppin State; Pepsi–Pouohkeepsie Classic 3rd place game	W 88–66	2–5	–	–	–	McCann Field House (1,852); Poughkeepsie, NY
December 20, 1985*		vs. Samford; Jaycee-Runnin' Joe Classic semifinals	L 73–77	2–6	29 – Anderson	–	–	Indian Fieldhouse (1,461); Jonesboro, AR
December 1985*		vs. Florida International; Jaycee-Runnin' Joe Classic 3rd place game	W 60–59	3–6	–	–	–	Indian Fieldhouse (871); Jonesboro, AR
December 30, 1985		at Loyola (MD)	L 75–86	3–7	20 – Anderson	8 – Cooper	–	Reitz Arena (1,340); Baltimore, MD
January 4, 1986		at Lehigh	L 66–79	3–8 (0–1)	16 – Cooper	8 – Rankin	8 – Anderson	Stabler Arena (500); Bethlehem, PA
January 8, 1986*		Central Connecticut	W 84–72	4–8	30 – Rankin	10 – Anderson	12 – Anderson	Daskalakis Athletic Center (853); Philadelphia, PA
January 11, 1986*		at Boston University	L 65–80	4–9	–	–	–	Case Gym (545); Boston, MA
January 15, 1986		at Hofstra	W 90–88 ^{OT}	5–9 (1–1)	–	–	–	Physical Fitness Center (1,715); Hempstead, NY
January 18, 1986		at Bucknell	L 68–69	5–10 (1–2)	–	–	–	Davis Gym (1,850); Lewisburg, PA
January 22, 1986		Rider	W 83–74	6–10 (2–2)	22 – Rankin	12 – Rankin	–	Daskalakis Athletic Center (786); Philadelphia, PA
January 25, 1986		at Delaware	W 90–89 ^{OT}	7–10 (3–2)	–	–	–	Delaware Field House (1,295); Newark, DE
January 1986*		King's College (PA)	W 80–65	8–10	–	–	–	Daskalakis Athletic Center (696); Philadelphia, PA
January 29, 1986		at Towson State	W 72–63	9–10 (4–2)	–	–	–	Towson Center (727); Towson, MD
February 1, 1986		Lafayette	W 78–67	10–10 (5–2)	–	–	–	Daskalakis Athletic Center (1,024); Philadelphia, PA
February 5, 1986		Lehigh	W 84–77	11–10 (6–2)	–	–	–	Daskalakis Athletic Center (1,225); Philadelphia, PA
February 8, 1986		Hofstra	L 65–66	11–11 (6–3)	–	–	–	Daskalakis Athletic Center (990); Philadelphia, PA
February 12, 1986		Bucknell	W 75–68	12–11 (7–3)	–	–	–	Daskalakis Athletic Center (959); Philadelphia, PA
February 15, 1986		at Rider	W 81–76	13–11 (8–3)	–	–	–	Alumni Gymnasium (857); Lawrenceville, NJ
February 19, 1986		Delaware	W 86–85	14–11 (9–3)	–	–	–	Daskalakis Athletic Center (1,156); Philadelphia, PA
February 22, 1986		Towson State	W 70–64	15–11 (10–3)	15 – Rankin	9 – Anderson	7 – Anderson	Daskalakis Athletic Center (742); Philadelphia, PA
February 24, 1986		at Lafayette	W 65–61	16–11 (11–3)	24 – Anderson	–	7 – Anderson	Kirby Sports Center (1,065); Easton, PA
ECC Tournament
March 1, 1986; 1:00 pm	(1)	vs. (8) Delaware; Quarterfinals	W 99–81	17–11	36 – Rankin	7 – Cooper	10 – Anderson	Towson Center (670); Towson, MD
March 2, 1986; 2:00 pm	(1)	vs. (4) Lafayette; Semifinals	W 78–69	18–11	22 – Anderson	9 – Anderson	7 – Anderson	Towson Center (510); Towson, MD
March 3, 1986; 7:30 pm	(1)	vs. (2) Hofstra; Championship	W 80–76	19–11	21 – Anderson	8 – Anderson	–	Towson Center (816); Towson, MD
1986 NCAA Division I men's basketball tournament
March 13, 1986	(15 W)	vs. (2 W) No. 7 Louisville; First Round	L 73–93	19–12	19 – Rankin	6 – Tied	8 – Anderson	Dee Events Center (9,037); Ogden, UT
*Non-conference game. ^{#}Rankings from AP. (#) Tournament seedings in parentheses. W=West. All times are in Eastern Time.

== Awards ==
Michael Anderson

- ECC Player of the Year
- ECC All-Conference First Team
- ECC Tournament Most Valuable Player
- ECC All-Tournament Team

Eddie Burke

- ECC Coach of the Year

John Rankin

- ECC Rookie of the Year
- ECC All-Rookie Team
- ECC All-Conference Second Team
- ECC All-Tournament Team
