= 2018–19 Drexel Dragons men's basketball team =

American college basketball season

2018–19 Drexel Dragons men's basketball
- Conference: Colonial Athletic Association
- Record: 13–19 (7–11 CAA)
- Head coach: Zach Spiker (3rd season)
- Assistant coaches: Paul Fortier (3rd season); Justin Jennings (3rd season); Rob O’Driscoll (3rd season)
- MVP: Camren Wynter
- Home arena: Daskalakis Athletic Center

2018–19 CAA men's basketball standings
	Conf.				Overall
Team	W		L	PCT	W		L	PCT
Hofstra	15	–	3	.833	27	–	8	.771
Northeastern †	14	–	4	.778	23	–	11	.676
Charleston	12	–	6	.667	24	–	9	.727
William & Mary	10	–	8	.556	14	–	17	.452
Delaware	8	–	10	.444	17	–	16	.515
Drexel	7	–	11	.389	13	–	19	.406
Elon	7	–	11	.389	11	–	21	.344
James Madison	6	–	12	.333	14	–	19	.424
Towson	6	–	12	.333	10	–	22	.313
UNC Wilmington	5	–	13	.278	10	–	23	.303
† 2019 CAA tournament winner

The 2018–19 Drexel Dragons men's basketball team represented Drexel University during the 2018–19 NCAA Division I men's basketball season. The Dragons, led by third-year head coach Zach Spiker, played their home games at the Daskalakis Athletic Center in Philadelphia, Pennsylvania as members of the Colonial Athletic Association. They finished the season 13–19, 7–11 in CAA play to finish in a tie for sixth place. They were defeated in the quarterfinals of the 2019 CAA men's basketball tournament by College of Charleston.

== Previous season ==
The Dragons finished the 2017–18 season 13–20, 6–12 in CAA play to finish in a tie for 7th place. They lost to Charleston in the CAA tournament.

== Offseason ==
=== Departures ===
Name	Number	Pos.	Height	Weight	Year	Hometown	Notes
Miles Overton	0	F	6'4"	215	RS Senior	Philadelphia, PA	Graduated
Tramaine Isabell	2	G	6'1"	180	RS Junior	Philadelphia, PA	Transferred to Saint Louis
Austin Williams	5	F	6'8"	245	Senior	Richmond, VA	Graduated; Signed to Frøya Ambassadors
Kris Alford	14	G	6'2"	185	Junior	Los Angeles, CA	Left team
Sammy Mojica	15	G	6'3"	195	Senior	Chestnut Hill, MA	Graduated; Drafted by Atléticos de San Germán
Tyshawn Myles	55	F	6'8"	250	Senior	Queens, NY	Graduated

=== Incoming transfers ===
College recruiting
Name	Hometown	School	Height	Weight	Commit date
Zach Walton; SF	Randle, WA	Edmonds Community College	6 ft 6 in (1.98 m)	205 lb (93 kg)	Apr 10, 2018
Zach Walton; SF	Recruit ratings: No ratings found				
Trevor John; SG	Danville, CA	Cal Poly	6 ft 3 in (1.91 m)	183 lb (83 kg)	May 2, 2018
Trevor John; SG	Recruit ratings: ESPN: (62)				
Overall recruit ranking:
Note: In many cases, Scout, Rivals, 247Sports, On3, and ESPN may conflict in their listings of height and weight.; In these cases, the average was taken. ESPN grades are on a 100-point scale.; Sources: "Drexel 2018 Basketball Commitments". Rivals.; "Drexel Dragons". ESPN.; "2018 Team Ranking". Rivals.

=== 2018 recruiting class ===
College recruiting
Name	Hometown	School	Height	Weight	Commit date
Coletrane Washington; SG	Leetsdale, PA	Quaker Valley High School	6 ft 4 in (1.93 m)	170 lb (77 kg)	Oct 28, 2017
Coletrane Washington; SG	Recruit ratings: No ratings found				
Camren Wynter; SG	Hicksville, NY	DME Academy	6 ft 3 in (1.91 m)	175 lb (79 kg)	May 6, 2018
Camren Wynter; SG	Recruit ratings: No ratings found				
Matej Juric; PG	Toronto, Canada	Lake Forest Academy	6 ft 0 in (1.83 m)	180 lb (82 kg)	May 30, 2018
Matej Juric; PG	Recruit ratings: No ratings found				
Overall recruit ranking:
Note: In many cases, Scout, Rivals, 247Sports, On3, and ESPN may conflict in their listings of height and weight.; In these cases, the average was taken. ESPN grades are on a 100-point scale.; Sources: "Drexel 2018 Basketball Commitments". Rivals.; "Drexel Dragons". ESPN.; "2018 Team Ranking". Rivals.

=== Class of 2019 early commitments ===
College recruiting (2019)
Name	Hometown	School	Height	Weight	Commit date
T.J. Bickerstaff; SF	Tyrone, GA	Sandy Creek High School	6 ft 8 in (2.03 m)	196 lb (89 kg)	Oct 19, 2018
T.J. Bickerstaff; SF	Recruit ratings: Rivals: 247Sports:				
Mate Okros; SG	United Kingdom	Myerscough College	6 ft 5 in (1.96 m)	175 lb (79 kg)	Nov 15, 2018
Mate Okros; SG	Recruit ratings: 247Sports:				
Overall recruit ranking:
Note: In many cases, Scout, Rivals, 247Sports, On3, and ESPN may conflict in their listings of height and weight.; In these cases, the average was taken. ESPN grades are on a 100-point scale.; Sources: "Drexel 2019 Basketball Commitments". Rivals.; "Drexel Dragons". ESPN.; "2019 Team Ranking". Rivals.

== Preseason ==
In a poll of the league coaches, media relations directors, and media members at the CAA's media day, Drexel was picked to finish in ninth place in the CAA. Junior guard Kurk Lee was named as an honorable mention to the preseason All-Conference team.

== Roster ==
2018–19 Drexel Dragons men's basketball team
Players
Coaches

Pos.	#	Name	Height	Weight	Year	Previous school	Hometown
G	0	Coletrane Washington	6 ft 4 in (1.93 m)	170 lb (77 kg)	Fr	Quaker Valley HS	Sewickley, PA
G	1	Kurk Lee Jr (injured)	5 ft 9 in (1.75 m)	150 lb (68 kg)	Jr	St. Frances (MD)	Baltimore, MD
F	2	Jarvis Doles	6 ft 9 in (2.06 m)	215 lb (98 kg)	So	Hammond HS (MD)/Mt. Zion Prep (MD)	Baltimore, MD
G	3	Troy Harper (injured)	6 ft 1 in (1.85 m)	175 lb (79 kg)	RS Sr	Neumann-Goretti HS/Campbell	Philadelphia, PA
F	4	Sam Green	6 ft 6 in (1.98 m)	220 lb (100 kg)	RS So	Bishop McNamara HS	Bowie, MD
F	5	Zach Walton (injured)	6 ft 6 in (1.98 m)	205 lb (93 kg)	RS Jr	Morton HS (WA)/Edmonds CC	Morton, WA
G	11	Camren Wynter	6 ft 2 in (1.88 m)	175 lb (79 kg)	Fr	Holy Trinity HS/DME Academy	Hempstead, NY
G	12	Jesse Reid (W)	6 ft 2 in (1.88 m)	175 lb (79 kg)	Fr	Seton Hall Prep	Bloomfield, NJ
F	13	Tim Perry Jr	6 ft 10 in (2.08 m)	218 lb (99 kg)	RS Fr	Cherry Hill HS East/The Phelps School	Cherry Hill, NJ
G	15	Matej Juric	6 ft 1 in (1.85 m)	189 lb (86 kg)	Fr	Lake Forest Academy/Oakwood	Toronto, Canada
G	20	Julian Adams (W)	6 ft 1 in (1.85 m)	175 lb (79 kg)	Jr	Dallastown Area HS	York, PA
G	23	Trevor John	6 ft 3 in (1.91 m)	190 lb (86 kg)	RS Sr	Monte Vista HS (Danville, CA)/Cal Poly	Danville, CA
G	24	Kevin Doi (W)	5 ft 9 in (1.75 m)	165 lb (75 kg)	RS Sr	Chadwick School	Rolling Hills Estates, CA
F	30	Alihan Demir	6 ft 9 in (2.06 m)	223 lb (101 kg)	RS Jr	West Oaks Academy/Central Wyoming	Ankara, Turkey
C	32	Tadas Kararinas	6 ft 10 in (2.08 m)	210 lb (95 kg)	So	Findlay Prep	Šilutė, Lithuania
F	51	James Butler	6 ft 8 in (2.03 m)	228 lb (103 kg)	RS So	Lake Braddock/Navy	Fairfax Station, VA

Head coach

- Zach Spiker (Ithaca)

Assistant coach(es)

- Paul Fortier (Washington)
- Justin Jennings (Penn State Behrend)
- Rob O'Driscoll (Villanova)

Legend

- (C) Team captain
- (S) Suspended
- (I) Ineligible
- (W) Walk-on
- Injured
- Current redshirt

Roster
Last update: February 25, 2019

- On February 23, 2019, Drexel announced that guard Troy Harper broke his foot during practice earlier in the week, and would miss the remainder of the season.

== Schedule and results ==
Date time, TV	Rank^{#}	Opponent^{#}	Result	Record	High points	High rebounds	High assists	Site (attendance) city, state
Exhibition
August 20, 2018*; 5:00 am		at Dandenong Rangers (SEABL)	L 94–104		22 – Walton	7 – Tied	8 – Lee	Dandenong Stadium; Dandenong, Victoria
August 21, 2018*; 5:30 am		at Hoops 24/7 All Stars	W 86–76		27 – Demir	17 – Butler	7 – Demir	Cardinia Life Leisure Centre; Pakenham, Victoria
August 23, 2018*; 5:00 am		at Cairns Taipans	L 76–92		18 – Walton	7 – Butler	–	Cairns Convention Centre; Cairns, Queensland
August 26, 2018*; 2:00 am, NBL TV		at Sydney Kings	L 52–79		12 – Doles	6 – Doles	–	Alexandria Basketball Stadium (600); Alexandria, New South Wales
November 3, 2018*; 4:00 pm		Clarion	W 99–65		21 – Demir	6 – Butler	5 – Wynter	Daskalakis Athletic Center; Philadelphia, PA
Non-conference regular season
November 9, 2018*; 11:00 am, ESPN3		at Eastern Michigan; Hub City Classic	L 62–66	0–1	19 – John	8 – Tied	4 – Lee	EMU Convocation Center (3,895); Ypsilanti, MI
November 11, 2018*; 3:00 pm, BTN+		at Rutgers; Hub City Classic	L 66–95	0–2	16 – Lee	8 – Demir	3 – Wynter	Louis Brown Athletic Center (4,214); Piscataway, NJ
November 14, 2018*; 7:00 pm		Bryn Athyn; Hub City Classic	W 118–41	1–2	26 – John	9 – Walton	8 – Wynter	Daskalakis Athletic Center (978); Philadelphia, PA
November 17, 2018*; 4:00 pm, ESPN+		at La Salle; City 6/A10–CAA Challenge	W 89–84	2–2	24 – Harper	8 – Walton	5 – Demir	Tom Gola Arena (1,410); Philadelphia, PA
November 21, 2018*; 3:00 pm		Boston University; Hub City Classic	W 86-67	3-2	22 – Wynter	8 – Tied	9 – Wynter	Daskalakis Athletic Center (660); Philadelphia, PA
November 25, 2018*; 3:00 pm, ESPN+		at Bowling Green	L 71–81	3–3	20 – Harper	12 – Butler	6 – Wynter	Stroh Center (1,410); Bowling Green, OH
November 28, 2018*; 7:00 pm		NJIT	L 67-70	3–4	18 – Demir	14 – Demir	3 – Tied	Daskalakis Athletic Center (828); Philadelphia, PA
December 1, 2018*; 2:00 pm		Robert Morris	W 82–69	4–4	17 – Demir	7 – Tied	4 – Tied	Daskalakis Athletic Center (1,481); Philadelphia, PA
December 5, 2018*; 7:00 pm		Loyola (MD)	W 95–86	5–4	24 – Demir	10 – Butler	10 – Wynter	Daskalakis Athletic Center (894); Philadelphia, PA
December 8, 2018*; 2:00 pm		UMBC	L 76–91	5–5	22 – Harper	8 – Butler	7 – Wynter	Daskalakis Athletic Center (1,159); Philadelphia, PA
December 16, 2018*; 6:00 pm		vs. Quinnipiac; Air Force Reserve Holiday Showcase	W 92–83	6–5	26 – Demir	7 – Wynter	6 – Wynter	Mohegan Sun Arena (5,812); Uncasville, CT
December 18, 2018*; 7:00 pm, SNY/ESPN3		at UConn	L 65–97	6–6	20 – Harper	7 – Tied	4 – Demir	XL Center (6,951); Hartford, CT
December 22, 2018*; 1:00 pm		Temple; City 6	L 64–82	6–7	18 – Harper	10 – Demir	5 – Demir	The Palestra (3,025); Philadelphia, PA
CAA regular season
December 28, 2018; 7:00 pm		at Northeastern	L 83–93	6–8 (0–1)	28 – Harper	10 – Demir	4 – Wynter	Matthews Arena (845); Boston, MA
December 30, 2018; 4:00 pm		at Hofstra	L 75–89	6–9 (0–2)	22 – Harper	7 – Butler	4 – Tied	Mack Sports Complex (1,512); Hempstead, NY
January 3, 2019; 7:00 pm		Elon	W 79–65	7–9 (1–2)	21 – Harper	8 – Demir	6 – Wynter	Daskalakis Athletic Center (502); Philadelphia, PA
January 5, 2019; 4:00 pm		William & Mary	L 66–84	7–10 (1–3)	17 – Harper	10 – Wynter	4 – Wynter	Daskalakis Athletic Center (831); Philadelphia, PA
January 10, 2019; 7:00 pm		at Charleston	W 79–78	8–10 (2–3)	22 – John	5 – Tied	6 – Harper	TD Arena (4,116); Charleston, SC
January 12, 2019; 2:00 pm		at UNC Wilmington	L 83–97	8–11 (2–4)	19 – Lee	10 – Butler	8 – Wynter	Trask Coliseum (3,991); Wilmington, NC
January 17, 2019; 7:00 pm		Towson	W 72–66	9–11 (3–4)	22 – Demir	16 – Demir	8 – Wynter	Daskalakis Athletic Center (1,191); Philadelphia, PA
January 19, 2019; 2:00 pm		James Madison	W 73–68	10–11 (4–4)	22 – Harper	12 – Butler	4 – Wynter	Daskalakis Athletic Center (2,119); Philadelphia, PA
January 26, 2019; 2:00 pm, NBCS/SNY		at Delaware	L 75–76	10–12 (4–5)	16 – Harper	8 – Butler	5 – Tied	Bob Carpenter Center (3,045); Newark, DE
January 31, 2019; 7:00 pm		at William & Mary	L 69–75	10–13 (4–6)	17 – Wynter	11 – Butler	7 – Wynter	Kaplan Arena (3,034); Williamsburg, VA
February 2, 2019; 7:00 pm		at Elon	W 67–63	11–13 (5–6)	14 – John	10 – Perry Jr.	4 – Tied	Schar Center (2,109); Elon, NC
February 7, 2019; 7:00 pm		UNC Wilmington	W 69–57	12–13 (6–6)	20 – Demir	15 – Butler	8 – Wynter	Daskalakis Athletic Center (917); Philadelphia, PA
February 9, 2019; 4:00 pm, NBCS+		Charleston	L 84–86	12–14 (6–7)	30 – Harper	8 – Butler	4 – Demir	Daskalakis Athletic Center (1,175); Philadelphia, PA
February 14, 2019; 7:00 pm		at James Madison	L 69–71	12–15 (6–8)	23 – Demir	13 – Butler	4 – Harper	JMU Convocation Center (2,084); Harrisonburg, VA
February 16, 2019; 2:00 pm		at Towson	L 77–92	12–16 (6–9)	17 – Demir	6 – Butler	8 – Wynter	SECU Arena (2,055); Towson, MD
February 23, 2019; 5:00 pm, NBCS/SNY		Delaware	W 68–60	13–16 (7–9)	19 – Wynter	9 – Butler	4 – Tied	Daskalakis Athletic Center (1,744); Philadelphia, PA
February 28, 2019; 7:00 pm, NBCS+		Hofstra	L 77–80	13–17 (7–10)	24 – Demir	7 – Wynter	8 – Wynter	Daskalakis Athletic Center (1,019); Philadelphia, PA
March 2, 2019; 4:00 pm, NBCS		Northeastern	L 66–90	13–18 (7–11)	19 – Wynter	9 – Demir	8 – Wynter	Daskalakis Athletic Center (1,348); Philadelphia, PA
CAA Tournament
March 10, 2019; 8:30 pm	(6)	vs. (3) Charleston; Quarterfinals	L 61–73	13–19	14 – Butler	9 – Butler	6 – Wynter	North Charleston Coliseum (4,040); North Charleston, SC
*Non-conference game. ^{#}Rankings from AP. (#) Tournament seedings in parentheses. All times are in Eastern Time.

== Team statistics ==
As of the end of the season.
Indicates team leader in each category.

(FG%, FT% leader = minimum 50 att.; 3P% leader = minimum 20 att.)

Player	GP	GS	MPG	PPG	RPG	APG	SPG	BPG	TPG	FG%	FT%	3P%
Julian Adams	2	0	4.5	0.0	0.0	0.5	0.5	0.0	1.0	.000	.000	.000
James Butler	32	32	26.7	10.3	8.2	0.5	0.3	0.5	1.0	.598	.736	.286
Alihan Demir	32	31	30.3	14.8	6.4	2.9	0.5	0.6	2.6	.512	.696	.274
Kevin Doi	5	1	6.2	3.6	0.8	0.8	0.2	0.0	1.0	.455	.600	.500
Jarvis Doles	30	0	10.0	4.1	1.5	0.4	0.2	0.2	0.4	.409	.828	.411
Sam Green	7	0	4.3	1.3	0.9	0.4	0.1	0.0	0.1	.375	.500	.400
Troy Harper	28	24	30.1	15.8	3.2	2.3	0.6	0.1	2.6	.389	.776	.247
Trevor John	32	32	32.6	11.9	2.5	1.0	0.7	0.0	0.6	.424	.941	.412
Matey Juric	25	3	11.3	1.6	0.8	1.0	0.6	0.1	0.9	.424	.727	.333
Tadas Kararinas	12	0	5.3	1.6	1.1	0.3	0.0	0.2	0.2	.500	1.000	.250
Atta Hassan	6	2	23.5	9.3	2.3	2.2	0.3	0.0	4.0	.272	1.00	.0
Kurk Lee	27	1	11.4	2.3	3.1	0.1	0.1	0.4	0.4	.698	.222	.000
Jesse Reid	2	0	3.5	1.0	1.5	0.5	0.0	0.0	0.0	1.000	.000	.000
Zach Walton	7	4	22.1	9.6	4.6	2.1	0.7	0.3	1.7	.481	.786	.286
Coletrane Washington	24	0	11.3	2.0	0.4	0.1	0.1	0.0	0.3	.291	.750	.267
Camren Wynter	32	30	34.1	11.3	4.6	5.4	1.4	0.1	2.4	.430	.762	.333
Team	32	-	-	75.8	35.2	14.5	4.5	1.9	11.7	.460	.753	.354

== Awards ==
James Butler

- "Sweep" Award (team leader in blocks)

Alihan Demir

- CAA All-Conference Third Team

Troy Harper

- CAA All-Conference Third Team
- Samuel D. Cozen Award (most improved player)

Trevor John

- Donald Shank Spirit & Dedication Award

Matej Juric

- Dragon "D" Award (team's top defensive player)
- Team Academic Award

Kurk Lee

- Preseason CAA All-Conference Honorable Mention

Camren Wynter

- Kyle Macy Freshman All-America Team
- CAA Rookie of the Year
- CAA All-Rookie Team
- CAA Rookie of the Week (5)
- Team Most Valuable Player
- Assist Award (team leader in assists)

== See also ==
- 2018–19 Drexel Dragons women's basketball team
