= 1988 East Coast Conference (Division I) men's basketball tournament =

- Classification: Division I
- Season: 1987–88
- Teams: 8
- Site: Towson Center; Towson, MD
- Champions: Lehigh (2nd title)
- Winning coach: Fran McCaffery (1st title)
- MVP: Mike Polaha (Lehigh)
- Television: ESPN (championship)

1987–88 East Coast Conference men's basketball standings
	Conf.				Overall
Team	W		L	PCT	W		L	PCT
Lafayette	11	–	3	.786	19	–	10	.655
Delaware	9	–	5	.643	19	–	9	.679
Drexel	9	–	5	.643	18	–	10	.643
Lehigh †	8	–	6	.571	21	–	10	.677
Bucknell	7	–	7	.500	16	–	12	.571
Rider	6	–	8	.429	10	–	19	.345
Towson State	4	–	10	.286	14	–	16	.467
Hofstra	2	–	12	.143	6	–	21	.222
† 1988 ECC tournament winner Rankings from AP poll

The 1988 East Coast Conference men's basketball tournament was held March 5–7, 1988. The champion gained and an automatic berth to the NCAA tournament.

== Bracket and results ==
Quarterfinals; Saturday, March 5
1	Lafayette	84
8	Hofstra	54
4	Lehigh	83
5	Bucknell	79
3	Delaware	82
6	Rider	88
2	Drexel	67
7	Towson State	74

Semifinals; Sunday, March 6
1	Lafayette	65
4	Lehigh	67
6	Rider	56
7	Towson State	59

Final; Monday, March 7
4	Lehigh	84
7	Towson State	78

== All-Tournament Team ==
- Marty Johnson, Towson State
- Tommy Jones, Towson State
- Mike Polaha, Lehigh – Tournament MVP
- Daren Queenan, Lehigh
- Ron Simpson, Rider
