= 1964–65 Drexel Dragons men's basketball team =

American college basketball season

1964–65 Drexel Dragons men's basketball

MAC College–Southern Regular Season Champions
- Conference: Middle Atlantic Conferences
- College–Southern
- Record: 18–4 (11–2 MAC)
- Head coach: Samuel Cozen (13th season)
- Home arena: Sayre High School

The 1964–65 Drexel Dragons men's basketball team represented Drexel Institute of Technology during the 1964–65 men's basketball season. The Dragons, led by 13th year head coach Samuel Cozen, were members of the College–Southern division of the Middle Atlantic Conferences (MAC).

The team finished the season 18–4, and finished in 1st place in the MAC in the regular season.

On February 27, 1965, Michael McCurdy set the Drexel team record for most points in a single game, scoring 37 points against Elizabethtown.

== Roster ==
1964–65 Drexel Dragons men's basketball team
Players
Coaches

Pos.	#	Name	Height	Weight	Year	Previous school	Hometown
		Michael McCurdy (C)	—	—	Sr
C		Joe Hertrick	—	—	So	North Penn HS
	34	Bob Ferguson	—	—
		Bill Murphy	—	—	So	St. Thomas More HS
		Ron Forys	—	—
	24	Dick Stanton	6 ft 3 in (1.91 m)	—
		Molluro	—	—	Sr

Head coach

- Samuel Cozen (Temple)

Assistant coach(es)

Legend

- (C) Team captain
- (S) Suspended
- (I) Ineligible
- (W) Walk-on
- Injured
- Current redshirt

== Schedule ==
Date time, TV	Rank^{#}	Opponent^{#}	Result	Record	High points	High rebounds	High assists	Site (attendance) city, state
Regular season
December 5, 1964*		at Delaware Valley	W 65–42	1–0	–	–	–	
December 12, 1964		at Upsala	W 62–59	2–0 (1–0)	–	–	–	
December 18, 1964		Swarthmore	W 81–52	3–0 (2–0)	–	–	–	Sayre High School; Philadelphia, Pennsylvania
December 28, 1964*		vs. East Stroudsburg; East Stroudsburg Holiday Invitational semifinals	W 83–77	4–0	–	–	–	West Chester, Pennsylvania
December 29, 1964*		vs. King's College (Pennsylvania); East Stroudsburg Holiday Invitational championship	L 69–70	4–1	–	–	–	
January 6, 1965		at Haverford	W 75–65	5–1 (3–0)	–	–	–	Ryan Gym; Haverford, Pennsylvania
January 8, 1965*		Merrimack	W 74–72	6–1	–	–	–	Sayre High School; Philadelphia, Pennsylvania
January 14, 1965		Lebanon Valley	W 76–75	7–1 (4–0)	–	–	–	Sayre High School; Philadelphia, Pennsylvania
January 16, 1965; 8:30 pm		at West Chester	L 64–66	7–2 (4–1)	–	–	–	West Chester, Pennsylvania
January 18, 1965		at Ursinus	W 92–69	8–2 (5–1)	–	–	–	
January 20, 1965		Pennsylvania Military College	W 95–45	9–2 (6–1)	–	–	–	Sayre High School; Philadelphia, Pennsylvania
January 27, 1965*		at Rider	W 77–75 ^{2OT}	10–2	–	–	–	
January 30, 1965		Franklin & Marshall	W 89–56	11–2 (7–1)	–	–	–	Sayre High School; Philadelphia, Pennsylvania
February 3, 1965		at Swarthmore	W 81–38	12–2 (8–1)	–	–	–	
February 6, 1965*		Delaware	W 81–73	13–2	–	19 – Ferguson	–	Sayre High School; Philadelphia, Pennsylvania
February 10, 1965		Haverford	W 69–45	14–2 (9–1)	–	–	–	Sayre High School; Philadelphia, Pennsylvania
February 13, 1965		at Johns Hopkins	W 62–46	15–2 (10–1)	–	–	–	
February 17, 1965		at Wagner	L 67–71	15–3 (10–2)	–	–	–	
February 20, 1965		Ursinus	W 104–75	16–3 (11–2)	–	–	–	Sayre High School; Philadelphia, Pennsylvania
February 24, 1965*		at Muhlenberg	W 79–75	17–3	22 – McCurdy	–	–	
1965 Middle Atlantic Conference men's basketball tournament
Unknown		vs. Albright; Semifinals	L 59–61	17–4	15 – McCurdy	– Hertrick	–	Allentown, Pennsylvania
February 27, 1965		vs. Elizabethtown; Third-place game	W 92–87	18–4	37 – McCurdy	13 – Ferguson	–	Allentown, Pennsylvania
*Non-conference game. ^{#}Rankings from AP. (#) Tournament seedings in parentheses. All times are in Eastern Time.
