= 1951–52 Drexel Dragons men's basketball team =

American college basketball season

1951–52 Drexel Dragons men's basketball
- Conference: Middle Atlantic States Collegiate Athletic Conference
- Southern
- Record: 9–10 (5–5 MASCAC)
- Head coach: Harold Kollar (3rd season)
- Captains: Alfred MacCart; Stan Laskus
- Home arena: Curtis Hall Gym, Sayre High School

The 1951–52 Drexel Dragons men's basketball team represented Drexel Institute of Technology during the 1951–52 men's basketball season. The Dragons, led by 3rd year head coach Harold Kollar, played their home games at Curtis Hall Gym, aside from 3 of their final 4 home games which were played at Sayre High School, and were members of the Southern division of the Middle Atlantic States Collegiate Athletic Conference (MASCAC).

In the 1951–52 season, Dan Promislo averaged 15.2 rebounds per game (288 in 19 games), settings a team record.

== Roster ==
1951–52 Drexel Dragons men's basketball team
Players
Coaches

Pos.	#	Name	Height	Weight	Year	Previous school	Hometown
F		Stan Laskus (C)	6 ft 0 in (1.83 m)	—		John Bartram HS
C		Basil Barno	6 ft 3 in (1.91 m)	—
		Bernard McNamee	6 ft 2 in (1.88 m)	—
G		Alfred MacCart (C)	5 ft 11 in (1.8 m)	—	Sr	John Bartram HS
		Carl Schaeffer	6 ft 4 in (1.93 m)	—
		George Seidel	5 ft 11 in (1.8 m)	—
		James Toner (injured)	5 ft 10 in (1.78 m)	—
F		Bob Brewton	6 ft 2 in (1.88 m)	—		Central HS (PA)
		Evans Morrison	6 ft 2 in (1.88 m)	—
		William Banks	—	—
		Dan Promislo	6 ft 2 in (1.88 m)	—
		J. Richard Walker	—	—
		Victor Quattrini	—	—
		Edward Roman	6 ft 2 in (1.88 m)	—
		Arthur Jones (injured)	—	—

Head coach

- Harold Kollar (Drexel)

Assistant coach(es)

Legend

- (C) Team captain
- (S) Suspended
- (I) Ineligible
- (W) Walk-on
- Injured
- Current redshirt

== Schedule ==
Date time, TV	Rank^{#}	Opponent^{#}	Result	Record	High points	High rebounds	High assists	Site (attendance) city, state
Regular season
Unknown*		Rutgers–Camden	W 46–44	1–0	–	–	–	
Unknown*		Lehigh	W 57–56	2–0	19 – MacCart	–	–	
January 8, 1952		Delaware	L 52–84	2–1 (0–1)	–	–	–	Philadelphia, PA
January 12, 1952		Swarthmore	W 77–63	3–1 (1–1)	15 – Barno	–	–	Curtis Hall Gym; Philadelphia, PA
January 14, 1952		at Haverford	W 63–53	4–1 (2–1)	19 – Barno	–	–	Ryan Gym; Haverford, PA
January 16, 1952*		Stevens Tech	W 77–54	5–1	20 – MacCart	–	–	
January 1952*		Philadelphia Textile	W 73–56	6–1	–	–	–	
January 23, 1952*		Naval Air Station (NJ)	L 77–78	6–2	–	–	–	
January 26, 1952*		at West Chester	L 67–75	6–3	20 – Barno	–	–	West Chester, PA
January 30, 1952*		at Saint Joseph's	L 54–66	6–4	11 – Tied	13 – Promislo	7 – MacCart	
February 1, 1952		Pennsylvania Military College	L 68–77	6–5 (2–2)	–	–	–	Sayre High School; Philadelphia, PA
February 6, 1952		Haverford	W 56–40	7–5 (3–2)	–	–	–	Curtis Hall Gym; Philadelphia, PA
February 9, 1952		Drexel Alumni						Curtis Hall Gym; Philadelphia, PA
February 11, 1952*		at Temple	L 68–88	7–6	12 – Schaeffer	–	–	South Hall; Philadelphia, PA
February 13, 1952		at Swarthmore	L 53–80	7–7 (3–3)	14 – Schaeffer	6 – 3 Tied	4 – 3 Tied	
February 15, 1952		Ursinus	W 82–56	8–7 (4–3)	–	–	–	Sayre High School; Philadelphia, PA
February 20, 1952		at Delaware	L 53–66	8–8 (4–4)	–	–	–	Newark, DE
February 1952		Pennsylvania Military College	L 84–98	8–9 (4–5)	–	–	–	
February 27, 1952*		Franklin & Marshall	L 85–91 ^{OT}	8–10	30 – Barno	26 – Promislo	11 – MacCart	Sayre High School; Philadelphia, PA
March 1, 1952		at Ursinus	W 64–63	9–10 (5–5)	20 – Barno	–	–	
*Non-conference game. ^{#}Rankings from AP. (#) Tournament seedings in parentheses. All times are in Eastern Time.
