= Mack Sports Complex =

Multi-purpose arena in Hempstead, New York

David S. Mack Sports and Exhibition Complex
- "The Mack"
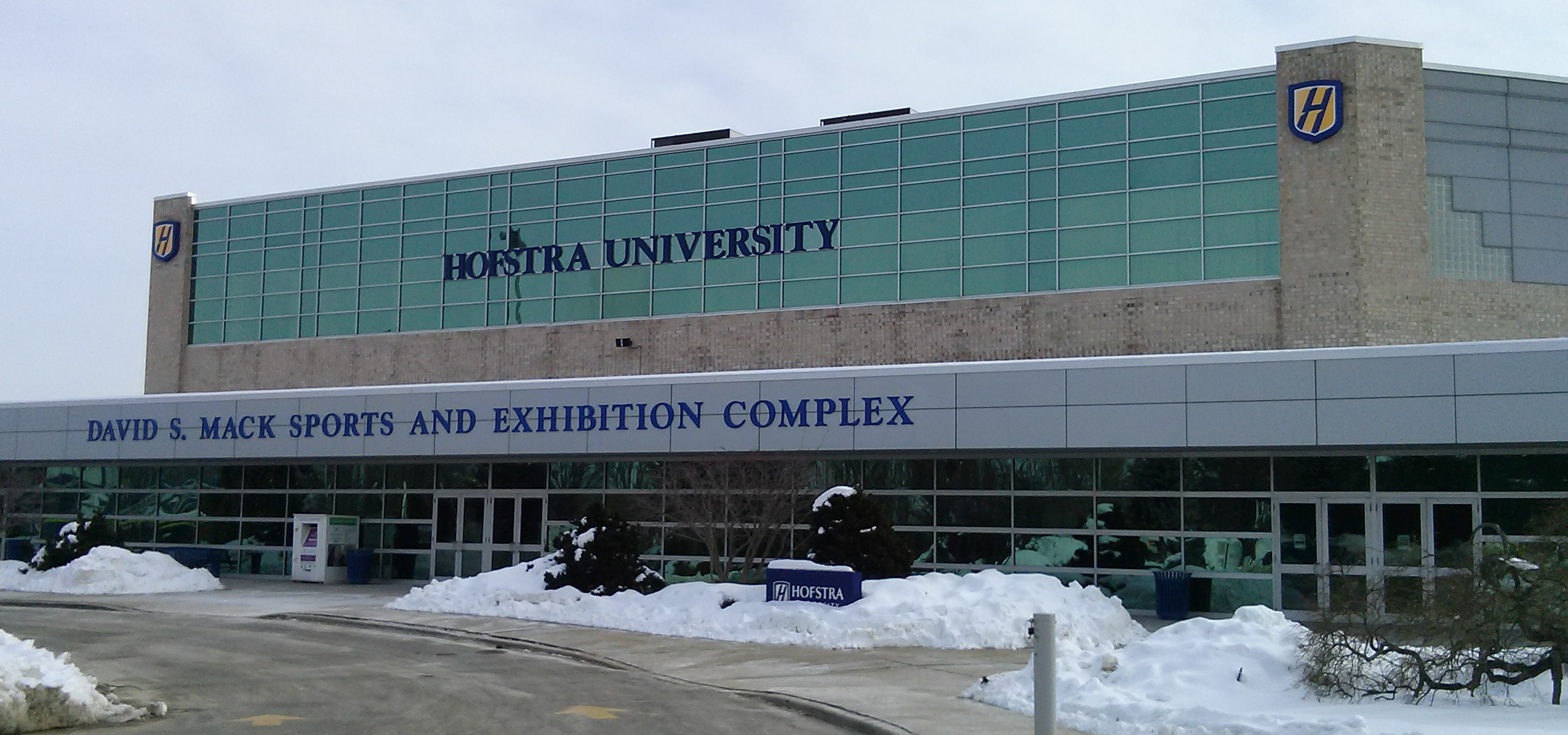
- Interactive map of David S. Mack Sports and Exhibition Complex
- Full name: David S. Mack Sports and Exhibition Complex
- Former names: Hofstra Arena (2000-2006)
- Location: 245 North Hofstra Avenue; Hempstead, NY 11549
- Coordinates: 40.719681°N 73.596865°W
- Owner: Hofstra University
- Operator: Hofstra University
- Capacity: 5,023 (Basketball)
- Surface: Hardwood

Construction
- Groundbreaking: October 1998
- Opened: January 2, 2000
- Cost: $15 million ($29 million in 2025 dollars)
- Architect: StanMar Inc.

Tenant
- Hofstra Pride

The David S. Mack Sports and Exhibition Complex, also known as Mack Sports Complex, or just "The Mack" for short, is a 5,023-seat multi-purpose arena in Hempstead, New York. Replacing the Hofstra Physical Fitness Center, the arena opened on January 2, 2000, as Hofstra Arena and was renamed for Mack in 2006.

== Basketball ==
It is home to the Hofstra University Pride men's and women's basketball teams, as well as the nationally ranked Pride wrestling team. It hosted the 2000 and 2001 title games of the America East Conference men's basketball tournaments, and also hosted two Postseason NIT games in 2006 (against Nebraska of the Big Twelve, and Old Dominion of the CAA). In 2006, Hofstra Arena was renamed the 'David S. Mack Sports and Exhibition Complex'. Hofstra belongs to the CAA (Coastal Athletic Association). Before an overtime loss to Drexel University in February, the Pride had previously won 28 consecutive regular season home games at the Mack. The Mack was also home to the nation's second longest home win streak (behind Gonzaga University) in 2006, before the Pride's NIT Quarterfinals loss to Old Dominion University. Hofstra University Men's Basketball has developed an excellent fan base on Long Island, especially in Nassau County, as it continues to have winning seasons year after year.

== Other events ==
Mack Sports Complex also hosts other events year round, such as college fairs, graduations and Kellenberg Memorial High School's Blue and Gold Sports Night. "The Mack" also hosted the final presidential debate of the 2008 U.S. presidential election between Republican John McCain and Democrat Barack Obama as well as the town hall format of the second presidential debate of the 2012 presidential election between Republican Mitt Romney and incumbent president Barack Obama. On September 26, 2016, it hosted the first presidential debate of the 2016 election between Republican Donald Trump and Democrat Hillary Clinton.

== See also ==
- List of NCAA Division I basketball arenas
