= 1954–55 Drexel Dragons men's basketball team =

American college basketball season

1954–55 Drexel Dragons men's basketball

MAC College–Southern Regular Season Champions
- Conference: Middle Atlantic Conferences
- College–Southern
- Record: 14–5 (9–1 MAC)
- Head coach: Samuel Cozen (3rd season)
- Home arena: Sayre High School

The 1954–55 Drexel Dragons men's basketball team represented Drexel Institute of Technology during the 1954–55 men's basketball season. The Dragons, led by 3rd year head coach Samuel Cozen, played their home games at Sayre High School and were members of the College–Southern division of the Middle Atlantic Conferences (MAC).

The team finished the season 14–5, and finished in 1st place in the MAC in the regular season.

== Roster ==
1954–55 Drexel Dragons men's basketball team
Players
Coaches

Pos.	#	Name	Height	Weight	Year	Previous school	Hometown
	3	Stanton Woerth	—	—
	4	Joseph Campbell	—	—
	5	Victor Quattrini	—	—
	6	Edward O'Brien	—	—
	7	William Harley	—	—
	9	Eugene Szukalski	—	—
	10	John Loomis	—	—
	11	J. Richard Walker	—	—
	12	Bob Ranonis	—	—
	15	Richard McGarrity	—	—
	16	Lawrence Humes	—	—
	17	Robert Buckley	—	—
		Meislich	—	—

Head coach

- Samuel Cozen (Temple)

Assistant coach(es)

Legend

- (C) Team captain
- (S) Suspended
- (I) Ineligible
- (W) Walk-on
- Injured
- Current redshirt

Roster

== Schedule ==
Date time, TV	Rank^{#}	Opponent^{#}	Result	Record	High points	High rebounds	High assists	Site (attendance) city, state
Regular season
January 4, 1955*		at Franklin & Marshall	W 85–70	1–0	–	26 – Buckley	–	
January 8, 1955		at Delaware	W 88–70	2–0 (1–0)	29 – Buckley	–	–	Newark, DE
January 1955		Ursinus	W 93–67	3–0 (2–0)	–	–	–	
January 15, 1955		Swarthmore	W 96–79	4–0 (3–0)	–	–	–	Sayre High School; Philadelphia, PA
January 19, 1955*		Villanova	L 66–73	4–1	21 – Buckley	–	–	
January 22, 1955*		Elizabethtown	W 90–81	5–1	–	–	–	Sayre High School; Philadelphia, PA
January 26, 1955*		Saint Joseph's	L 78–81	5–2	–	–	–	Sayre High School; Philadelphia, PA
January 29, 1955*		Susquehanna	W 80–55	6–2	–	–	–	Sayre High School; Philadelphia, PA
February 2, 1955*		West Chester	W 93–58	7–2	25 – Buckley	–	–	
February 5, 1955; 3:30 pm		Pennsylvania Military College	W 72–60	8–2 (4–0)	19 – Tied	–	–	Sayre High School; Philadelphia, PA
February 9, 1955		at Haverford	W 89–85	9–2 (5–0)	28 – Walker	–	–	Ryan Gym; Haverford, PA
February 12, 1955		at Pennsylvania Military College	L 57–59	9–3 (5–1)	18 – Walker	–	–	
February 14, 1955*		at Lebanon Valley	L 80–94	9–4	29 – Buckley	–	–	Annville, PA
February 15, 1955		Delaware	W 86–80	10–4 (6–1)	24 – Loomis	–	–	Sayre High School; Philadelphia, PA
February 19, 1955		at Swarthmore	W 67–56	11–4 (7–1)	–	–	–	
February 23, 1955		Haverford	W 92–63	12–4 (8–1)	23 – Walker	–	–	Sayre High School; Philadelphia, PA
February 26, 1955		at Ursinus	W 108–77	13–4 (9–1)	23 – Buckley	–	–	
March 1, 1955*		Philadelphia Textile	L 76–78	13–5	24 – Buckley	–	–	Sayre High School; Philadelphia, PA
March 5, 1955*; 2:00 pm		at Rutgers–Camden	W 95–72	14–5	–	–	–	Gloucester High School; Gloucester, NJ
*Non-conference game. ^{#}Rankings from AP. (#) Tournament seedings in parentheses. All times are in Eastern Time.

== Awards ==
John Loomis

- MAC Southern All-Conference Team

Bob Buckley

- MAC Southern All-Conference Team

Richard Walker

- MAC Southern All-Conference Team
