= Edward Burke (basketball) =

American basketball player and coach

Eddie Burke
Biographical details
- Born: December 4, 1945
- Died: March 23, 2009 (aged 63); Havertown, Pennsylvania, U.S.

Playing career
- 1963–1967: La Salle
- Position: Point guard

Coaching career (HC unless noted)
- 1967–1968: St. Joseph's Prep (assistant)
- 1968–1971: St. Joseph's Prep
- 1971–1975: St. Thomas More HS
- 1975–1976: Bishop McDevitt HS
- 1976–1977: West Catholic HS
- 1977–1991: Drexel

Head coaching record
- Overall: 205–189

Accomplishments and honors

Awards
- ECC Coach of the Year (1986)

Edward J. Burke (December 4, 1945 – March 23, 2009) was an American college basketball coach who led the Drexel Dragons men's basketball program from 1977 to 1991.

== Early life and high school ==
Burke was born in 1945, the fourth of five children. He liked to remark that he was the only one of his siblings that did not enter the religious life. He attended St. Joseph's Prep, where he played point guard on their high school basketball team. With NBA player Matt Guokas, Burke was a part of the 1962 Philadelphia Catholic League championship team as a junior. The team lost to West Philadelphia High School 61–52 in the city title game. As a senior, Burke led the entire Catholic League in scoring.

== College ==
Burke played for La Salle University from 1963 to 1967. A large knee injury ended his playing career in his senior season.

== Early coaching career ==
After Burke graduated from La Salle, he earned a job as freshman coach at his alma mater, St. Joseph's Prep. He was soon promoted to head coach, and won the 1971 Catholic League Championship. Phil Martelli, who would later become the coach of St. Joseph's, was a member of that team, and said that Burke "made coaching personal. It was about you as a person. He used a lot of humor. He made you want to practice, and he made you want to play." The following year, Burke coached St. Thomas More High School to a Catholic League title and to the 1972 City Championship. Burke won the Catholic League Coach of the Year honors for the second straight season. He is the only coach to accomplish this feat at two different high schools. St. Thomas More closed in 1975, and Burke came to Bishop McDevitt and West Catholic for one year each.

== Drexel ==
Drexel hired Burke as their new head coach in 1977. His top assistants for a few years in the 1980s were future Villanova coach Jay Wright and future Bucknell coach Pat Flannery. His best season was in 1985–86, when his Dragons, led by Michael Anderson, won 19 games and defeated Hofstra in the East Coast Conference title game to earn a bid to the school's first NCAA Tournament. Drexel received a 15 seed, and lost to eventual national champion Louisville 93–73 in the first round. Following the season, he was named East Coast Conference Coach of the Year and Michael Anderson became the first Drexel player to make the NBA. In 1987, he coached the Dragons to an upset over the David Robinson-led Navy Midshipmen at the Palestra.

Burke was released by Drexel on March 8, 1991, after finishing the year 12–16, the third consecutive losing season. According to Richard E. Woodring, the Drexel vice president for student life, Drexel wanted to head in a "new direction" as the school moved to the North Atlantic Conference in 1991–92. He was replaced by George Washington assistant Bill Herrion. In Burke's 14 seasons, he compiled a record of 205–189. His 205 victories are the second most of any Drexel coach.

== Later life ==
After his stint at Drexel, Burke returned to coaching St. Joseph's Prep, where he coached from 1992 to 1999. In 1999, he became the school's director of alumni relations and held the post until 2004. Upon retiring, he began to redo his family's restaurant, Burke's Inn, in Havertown, Pennsylvania. He added to the menu and turned the tavern into a sports bar.

== Death ==
In 2009, Burke was diagnosed with lung cancer. He was about to receive treatment when he died on March 23 in Havertown at the age of 63. He was survived by his wife, Bette Ann; his children, Melissa, Maureen, and Brendan; and five grandchildren. Burke was buried at Holy Cross Cemetery in Yeadon.

== Career coaching record ==
The career coaching record of Edward J. Burke is as follows:

Record table
Season	Team	Overall	Conference	Standing	Postseason
Drexel Dragons (East Coast Conference) (1977–1991)
1977–78	Drexel	13–13	2–3		
1978–79	Drexel	18–9	7–6		
1979–80	Drexel	12–15	4–7		
1980–81	Drexel	14–13	6–5		
1981–82	Drexel	19–11	7–4		
1982–83	Drexel	14–15	5–4		
1983–84	Drexel	17–12	10–6		
1984–85	Drexel	10–18	8–6		
1985–86	Drexel	19–12	11–3		NCAA Round of 64
1986–87	Drexel	14–14	7–7		
1987–88	Drexel	18–10	9–5		
1988–89	Drexel	12–16	7–7		
1989–90	Drexel	13–15	7–7		
1990–91	Drexel	12–16	7–5		
Drexel:		205–189	98–75		
Total:		205–189			
National champion Postseason invitational champion Conference regular season champion Conference regular season and conference tournament champion Division regular season champion Division regular season and conference tournament champion Conference tournament champion
