= Todd Lehmann =

American basketball player

Personal information
- Listed height: 5 ft 11 in (1.80 m)

Career information
- High school: Holy Cross (Delran, New Jersey)
- College: Drexel (1986–1990)
- NBA draft: 1990: undrafted
- Position: Point guard
- Coaching career: 1998–2000

Career history

Coaching
- 1998–2000: Rowan (assistant)

Career highlights
- NCAA assists leader (1990); 2× Second-team All-ECC (1989, 1990); ECC All-Rookie Team (1987)

Todd Lehmann is an American former basketball player. He played for Drexel University for four years. In 1990, as a senior, he led the nation with 9.29 assists per game. His 260 total assists that season was a school record.

Lehmann was raised in Riverside Township, New Jersey and played high school basketball at Holy Cross, where he and his sister both scored the 1,000th point of their career on the same night.

Lehmann was later an assistant coach for Rowan University for two seasons. In 2007, he was inducted into the Drexel Athletics Hall of Fame.

His father, George, played in the NBA and ABA for seven years.

== See also ==
- List of NCAA Division I men's basketball season assists leaders
