= Hofstra Physical Fitness Center =

Multi-purpose arena in Hempstead, New York, United States

Physical Fitness Center
- Full name: Hofstra University Physical Fitness Center
- Location: Hempstead, New York, U.S.
- Owner: Hofstra University
- Operator: Hofstra University
- Capacity: 2,500

Construction
- Opened: 1970

Tenants
- Hofstra Pride men's basketball (1970-1999); Hofstra Pride volleyball New York Liberties (Major League Volleyball) (1987)

The Hofstra Physical Fitness Center is a 2,500-seat multi-purpose arena in the town of Hempstead, in the U.S. state of New York. It opened in 1970. It was home to the Hofstra University Pride basketball team until the Hofstra Arena opened in 1999.
