= Charlie Woollum =

Head coach of Bucknell Bison men's basketball team

Personal information
- Born: 1940 (age 85–86)

Career information
- College: William & Mary (1959–1962)
- NBA draft: 1962: undrafted

Career history

Coaching
- 1962–1964: William & Mary (assistant)
- 1964–1971: Newport News HS
- 1971–1972: Ferguson HS
- 1972–1975: Old Dominion (assistant)
- 1975–1994: Bucknell
- 1994–2000: William & Mary

Career highlights
- 3× ECC Coach of the Year (1984, 1985, 1987); Patriot League Coach of the Year (1993); CAA Coach of the Year (1998)

Charles R. Woollum (born 1940) is the former head coach for the Bucknell Bison men's basketball team, which he coached from 1975 to 1994. During his 19 years at the program's helm, Woollum compiled a 318–221 record. This victory total is higher than that of any other coach in any one sport in Bucknell's intercollegiate athletic history. The Bison reached the NCAA Tournament in 1987 and 1989 by winning the East Coast Conference Tournament. Woollum also won six regular season conference titles (1984, 1985, 1987, 1989, 1992, 1993), three ECC and one Patriot League Coach of the Year awards, coached 27 all-conference players, three league players of the year, six Academic All-Americans and all seven of the top scorers in school history. He was inducted into the Bucknell Hall of Fame in 1995.

Following his career at Bucknell, Woollum moved on to coach his alma mater, William & Mary, from 1994 to 2000. During his six-year tenure, Woollum compiled an overall record of 69–94 (39–52 in conference play). He guided the Tribe to the program's first Colonial Athletic Association regular season championship in 1998 after finishing 13–3 in the conference.

He is currently the radio color commentator for the William & Mary men's basketball team.
