= Ray Haesler =

American basketball coach

Playing career
- 1963–1966: Rider

Coaching career (HC unless noted)
- 1967–1971: Drexel (assistant)
- 1971–1977: Drexel
- 1979–1985: Eastern Regional HS (NJ)

Head coaching record
- Overall: 80–60 (.571) (college); 93–56 (.624) (high school)

Accomplishments and honors

Awards
- 1976 ECC coach of the year

Rayfield J. Haesler is an American former basketball coach who was head coach of the Drexel Dragons men's basketball team from 1971 to 1977.

== Playing ==
Haesler was a standout basketball player at Abraham Lincoln High School in Philadelphia. He was the second leading scorer in the Philadelphia Public League during the 1961–62 season. He played three seasons (1963–1966) of varsity basketball at Rider University under Robert Greenwood and Dick Harter. He earned a master's degree at Michigan State University

== Coaching ==
From 1967 to 1971, Haesler was an assistant athletic director and assistant basketball coach at Drexel. He was promoted to head coach in 1971 when Frank Szymanski left for the University of Baltimore. He compiled an 80–60 record over six seasons, but never made the East Coast Conference men's basketball tournament playoffs. In 1976, Haesler was named the ECC's coach of the year after leading Drexel to a 17–6 record, including upset victories over Morgan State, La Salle, Temple, and Saint Joseph's. The following season, the Dragons fell to 11–13 and Haesler's contract was not renewed.

From 1979 to 1985, Haesler amassed a 93–56 record as the head boy's basketball coach at Eastern Regional High School in Voorhees Township, New Jersey. He led the Vikings to the South Jersey Group 3 final in his last year with the team.
