= Delaware Fightin' Blue Hens men's basketball statistical leaders =

The Delaware Fightin' Blue Hens basketball statistical leaders are individual statistical leaders of the Delaware Fightin' Blue Hens men's basketball program in various categories, including points, rebounds, assists, steals, and blocks. Within those areas, the lists identify single-game, single-season, and career leaders. The Fightin' Blue Hens represent the University of Delaware in the NCAA's Colonial Athletic Association.

Delaware began competing in intercollegiate basketball in 1905. However, the school's record book does not generally list records from before the 1950s, as records from before this period are often incomplete and inconsistent. Since scoring was much lower in this era, and teams played much fewer games during a typical season, it is likely that few or no players from this era would appear on these lists anyway.

The NCAA did not officially record assists as a stat until the 1983–84 season, and blocks and steals until the 1985–86 season, but Delaware's record books includes players in these stats before these seasons. These lists are updated through the end of the 2020–21 season.

== Scoring ==
Career
Rk	Player	Points	Seasons
1	Devon Saddler	2,222	2010–11 2011–12 2012–13 2013–14
2	Mike Pegues	2,030	1996–97 1997–98 1998–99 1999–00
3	Ryan Allen	1,821	2017–18 2018–19 2019–20 2020–21 2021–22
4	Greg Smith	1,713	1993–94 1994–95 1995–96 1996–97
5	Ken Luck	1,613	1978–79 1979–80 1980–81 1981–82
6	Mark Murray	1,559	1988–89 1989–90 1990–91 1991–92
7	Jawan Carter	1,542	2008–09 2009–10 2010–11
8	Brian Pearl	1,532	1991–92 1992–93 1993–94 1994–95
9	Alex Coles	1,471	1988–89 1989–90 1990–91 1991–92
10	Oscar Jones	1,387	1982–83 1983–84 1984–85 1985–86

Season
Rk	Player	Points	Season
1	Davon Usher	679	2013–14
2	Mike Pegues	675	1998–99
3	Nate Darling	672	2019–20
4	Mike Pegues	667	1999–00
5	Greg Smith	660	1996–97
6	Devon Saddler	656	2012–13
7	Devon Saddler	603	2011–12
	John Camden	603	2024–25
9	Jameer Nelson Jr.	597	2022–23
10	Spencer Dunkley	576	1992–93

Single game
Rk	Player	Points	Season	Opponent
1	Liston A. Houston	52	1909–10	Lebanon Valley
2	Dave Sysko	45	1963–64	Lafayette
3	Jim Smith	43	1955–56	Swarthmore
4	Davon Usher	42	2013–14	College of Charleston
	Frank Wickes	42	1957–58	Swarthmore
6	Frank Wickes	41	1958–59	Bucknell
7	Ken Luck	40	1981–82	West Chester
8	Jameer Nelson Jr.	39	2022–23	UNC Wilmington
	Spencer Dunkley	39	1992–93	Vermont
	Ken Luck	39	1981–82	Lehigh

== Rebounds ==
Career
Rk	Player	Rebounds	Seasons
1	Jamelle Hagins	1,078	2009–10 2010–11 2011–12 2012–13
2	Spencer Dunkley	916	1989–90 1990–91 1991–92 1992–93
3	Nate Cloud	882	1960–61 1961–62 1962–63
4	Greg Smith	878	1993–94 1994–95 1995–96 1996–97
5	Wolfgang Fengler	826	1971–72 1972–73 1973–74
6	Eric Carter	818	2014–15 2016–17 2017–18 2018–19
7	Mike Pegues	785	1996–97 1997–98 1998–99 1999–00
8	Harding Nana	784	2003–04 2004–05 2005–06
9	Frank Wickes	755	1956–57 1957–58 1958–59
10	Alex Coles	711	1988–89 1989–90 1990–91 1991–92

Season
Rk	Player	Rebounds	Season
1	Spencer Dunkley	367	1992–93
2	Jamelle Hagins	354	2011–12
3	Jamelle Hagins	353	2012–13
4	Greg Smith	342	1996–97
5	Wolfgang Fengler	333	1973–74
6	Marc Egerson	331	2008–09
7	Harding Nana	326	2005–06
	Jack Waddington	326	1955–56
9	Harding Nana	322	2004–05
10	Nate Cloud	320	1962–63

Single game
Rk	Player	Rebounds	Season	Opponent
1	Jack Waddington	31	1955–56	Rutgers
2	Nate Cloud	28	1962–63	Muhlenberg
3	Spencer Dunkley	25	1992–93	UMBC
	Mark Wagaman	25	1966–67	Drexel
	Pete Cloud	25	1963–64	Johns Hopkins
	Nate Cloud	25	1962–63	Lehigh
7	Jamelle Hagins	23	2012–13	Lafayette
	Bernard Lane	23	1969–70	Lafayette
	Nate Cloud	23	1961–62	Swarthmore
	Harris Mosher	23	1957–58	Ursinus
	Nate Cloud	23	1960–61	Muhlenberg
	Pete Cloud	23	1963–64	Ursinus

== Assists ==
Career
Rk	Player	Assists	Seasons
1	Taurence Chisholm	877	1984–85 1985–86 1986–87 1987–88
2	Mike Slattery	607	2001–02 2002–03 2003–04 2004–05
3	Brian Johnson	510	2006–07 2007–08 2008–09 2010–11
4	Brian Pearl	501	1991–92 1992–93 1993–94 1994–95
5	Kevin Anderson	421	2017–18 2018–19 2019–20 2020–21 2021–22
6	John Staudenmayer	416	1979–80 1980–81 1981–82 1982–83
7	Tyrone Perry	376	1995–96 1996–97 1997–98 1998–99
8	Rob Garner	369	1993–94 1994–95 1995–96
9	Tom Campbell	360	1977–78 1978–79 1979–80 1980–81
10	Mark Mancini	357	1975–76 1976–77 1977–78 1978–79

Season
Rk	Player	Assists	Season
1	Taurence Chisholm	231	1985–86
2	Taurence Chisholm	224	1984–85
3	Taurence Chisholm	220	1986–87
4	Taurence Chisholm	203	1987–88
5	John Staudenmayer	185	1981–82
6	Christian Bliss	184	2025–26
7	Mike Slattery	179	2002–03
8	Mike Slattery	168	2004–05
	John Staudenmayer	168	1982–83
10	Mike Slattery	166	2003–04
	Bill Sullivan	166	1974–75

Single game
Rk	Player	Assists	Season	Opponent
1	John Staudenmayer	17	1981–82	Lehigh
2	Mike Slattery	15	2002–03	William & Mary
	Mike Slattery	15	2002–03	UNC Greensboro
	Vic Orth	15	1965–66	Franklin & Marshall
5	Austen Rowland	14	2000–01	New Hampshire
	Taurence Chisholm	14	1986–87	Drexel
	Taurence Chisholm	14	1985–86	Lafayette
	Taurence Chisholm	14	1985–86	Penn
9	Jarvis Threatt	13	2013–14	College of Charleston
	Taurence Chisholm	13	1986–87	Columbia
	Taurence Chisholm	13	1985–86	Hofstra
	Taurence Chisholm	13	1984–85	Hofstra
	Jon Chamberlain	13	1983–84	West Chester
	Taurence Chisholm	13	1984–85	Washington College
	Ken Helfand	13	1971–72	Lehigh

== Steals ==
Career
Rk	Player	Steals	Seasons
1	Taurence Chisholm	298	1984–85 1985–86 1986–87 1987–88
2	Tyrone Perry	186	1995–96 1996–97 1997–98 1998–99
3	Ken Luck	173	1978–79 1979–80 1980–81 1981–82
4	Mike Slattery	168	2001–02 2002–03 2003–04 2004–05
5	Jarvis Threatt	159	2011–12 2012–13 2013–14
	Anthony Wright	159	1989–90 1990–91 1991–92 1992–93
7	Brian Pearl	158	1991–92 1992–93 1993–94 1994–95
	Kevin Anderson	158	2017–18 2018–19 2019–20 2020–21 2021–22
9	Ryan Iversen	150	2000–01 2001–02 2002–03
10	Oscar Jones	149	1982–83 1983–84 1984–85 1985–86
	Mark Murray	149	1988–89 1989–90 1990–91 1991–92

Season
Rk	Player	Steals	Season
1	Taurence Chisholm	84	1986–87
2	Taurence Chisholm	77	1984–85
3	Taurence Chisholm	74	1987–88
4	Jameer Nelson Jr.	71	2022–23
5	Zaire Taylor	68	2005–06
6	Jarvis Threatt	64	2013–14
7	Taurence Chisholm	63	1985–86
8	Davon Usher	62	2013–14
	Tyrone Perry	62	1996–97
10	Jameer Nelson Jr.	57	2021–22

Single game
Rk	Player	Steals	Season	Opponent
1	Jameer Nelson	8	2021–22	Charleston
	Taurence Chisholm	8	1984–85	Bucknell
3	Davon Usher	7	2013–14	College of Charleston
	John Gordon	7	1998–99	Maine
	Tyrone Perry	7	1996–97	Delaware State
	Renard Johnson	7	1988–89	Rider
	Taurence Chisholm	7	1987–88	West Chester
8	Jameer Nelson	6	2022–23	Monmouth
	Jarvis Threatt	6	2012–13	Hofstra
	Herb Courtney	6	2006–07	Drexel
	Ryan Iversen	6	2002–03	Old Dominion
	David Lunn	6	2002–03	Towson
	Kestutis Marciulionis	6	1999–00	Hartford
	Tyrone Perry	6	1996–97	Widener
	Rob Garner	6	1995–96	Washington College
	Anthony Wright	6	1992–93	Vermont
	Renard Johnson	6	1989–90	Mississippi State
	Taurence Chisholm	6	1986–87	Rider

== Blocks ==
Career
Rk	Player	Blocks	Seasons
1	Jamelle Hagins	292	2009–10 2010–11 2011–12 2012–13
2	Spencer Dunkley	195	1989–90 1990–91 1991–92 1992–93
3	John Bennett	148	1995–96 1996–97 1997–98 1998–99
4	Herb Courtney	117	2003–04 2005–06 2006–07 2007–08
5	Ndongo Ndiaye	110	1998–99 1999–00
6	Alex Coles	107	1988–89 1989–90 1990–91 1991–92
7	Pete Mullenberg	106	1977–78 1978–79 1979–80 1980–81
8	Denard Montgomery	93	1988–89 1989–90 1990–91 1991–92
9	Harding Nana	92	2003–04 2004–05 2005–06
10	Calvin Smith	85	2001–02 2002–03 2003–04 2004–05

Season
Rk	Player	Blocks	Season
1	Ndongo Ndiaye	99	1999–00
2	Spencer Dunkley	96	1992–93
3	Jamelle Hagins	95	2011–12
4	John Bennett	93	1998–99
5	Jamelle Hagins	87	2010–11
6	Ajmal Basit	81	2000–01
7	Jamelle Hagins	80	2012–13
8	Herb Courtney	54	2006–07
9	Jim Ledsome	52	2008–09
10	Carl Baptiste	50	2013–14

Single game
Rk	Player	Blocks	Season	Opponent
1	Ndongo Ndiaye	9	1999–00	Colgate
2	Jamelle Hagins	8	2010–11	Northeastern
	Ajmal Basit	8	2000–01	Drexel
	Ndongo Ndiaye	8	1999–00	Towson
	John Bennett	8	1998–99	American
	Spencer Dunkley	8	1990–91	Navy
	Pete Mullenberg	8	1977–78	Lehigh
8	Jamelle Hagins	7	2011–12	Georgia State
	Jamelle Hagins	7	2010–11	Villanova
	Jamelle Hagins	7	2010–11	William & Mary
	Jim Ledsome	7	2008–09	Central Connecticut
	Jim Ledsome	7	2007–08	Maryland
	Calvin Smith	7	2002–03	Long Island
	Ajmal Basit	7	2000–01	Loyola (Md.)
	Ndongo Ndiaye	7	1999–00	New Hampshire
	Ndongo Ndiaye	7	1999–00	Delaware State
	Ndongo Ndiaye	7	1999–00	Rider
	Spencer Dunkley	7	1992–93	Mount St. Mary's
	Spencer Dunkley	7	1992–93	Maine
	Spencer Dunkley	7	1992–93	Vermont
