= 1995 North Atlantic Conference men's basketball tournament =

Sporting event

1995 America East men's basketball tournament
- Classification: Division I
- Season: 1994–95
- Teams: 9
- Champions: Drexel (2nd title)
- Winning coach: Bill Herrion (2nd title)
- MVP: Malik Rose (Drexel)

1994–95 North Atlantic Conference men's basketball standings
	Conf.				Overall
Team	W		L	PCT	W		L	PCT
Drexel †	12	–	4	.750	22	–	8	.733
New Hampshire	11	–	5	.688	19	–	9	.679
Northeastern	10	–	6	.625	18	–	11	.621
Hartford	7	–	9	.438	11	–	16	.407
Boston University	7	–	9	.438	15	–	16	.484
Vermont	7	–	9	.438	14	–	13	.519
Delaware	7	–	9	.438	12	–	15	.444
Maine	6	–	10	.375	11	–	16	.407
Hofstra	5	–	11	.313	10	–	18	.357
† 1995 NAC tournament winner Rankings from AP poll

The 1995 North Atlantic Conference men's basketball tournament was hosted by the higher seeds in head-to-head matchups. The final was held at Daskalakis Athletic Center on the campus of Drexel University. Drexel gained its second consecutive America East Conference Championship and an automatic berth to the NCAA tournament with its win over Boston University. Drexel was given the 13th seed in the East Regional of the NCAA Tournament and lost in the first round to Oklahoma State 73–49.

== Bracket and results ==
First round
8	Maine	59
9	Hofstra	88

Second round
1	Drexel	108
9	Hofstra	75
4	Hartford	59
5	Boston U.	69
2	New Hampshire	83
7	Delaware	81
3	Northeastern	73*
6	Vermont	71

Semifinals
1	Drexel	62
5	Boston U.	53
2	New Hampshire	70
3	Northeastern	91

Finals
1	Drexel	72
3	Northeastern	52

* Game ended in overtime

== See also ==
- America East Conference
