= 1992 North Atlantic Conference men's basketball tournament =

College basketball tournament

- Classification: Division I
- Season: 1991–92
- Teams: 8
- Site: Delaware Field House; Newark, Delaware
- Champions: Delaware (1st title)
- Winning coach: Steve Steinwedel (1st title)
- MVP: Alex Coles (Delaware)
- North Atlantic Conference men's basketball tournaments

1991–92 North Atlantic Conference men's basketball standings
	Conf.				Overall
Team	W		L	PCT	W		L	PCT
Delaware †	14	–	0	1.000	27	–	4	.871
Drexel	9	–	5	.643	16	–	14	.533
Maine	8	–	6	.571	17	–	15	.531
Vermont	7	–	7	.500	16	–	13	.552
Northeastern	5	–	9	.357	9	–	19	.321
Boston University	5	–	9	.357	10	–	18	.357
New Hampshire	5	–	9	.357	7	–	21	.250
Hartford	3	–	11	.214	6	–	21	.222
† 1992 NAC tournament winner Rankings from AP poll

The 1992 North Atlantic Conference men's basketball tournament was hosted by the higher seeds in head-to-head matchups. The final was held at Delaware Field House on the campus of the University of Delaware. Delaware gained its first overall America East Conference Championship and an automatic berth to the NCAA tournament with its win over Drexel. Delaware was given the 13th seed in the Midwest Regional of the NCAA Tournament and lost in the first round to Cincinnati 85–47.

== Bracket and Results ==
Quarterfinals
1	Delaware	92
8	Hartford	56
4	Vermont	74
5	Northeastern	64
3	Maine	68
6	Boston U.	51
2	Drexel	78
7	New Hampshire	72

Semifinals
1	Delaware	76
4	Vermont	64
3	Maine	79
2	Drexel	97

Finals
1	Delaware	92
2	Drexel	68

== See also ==
- America East Conference
