= Steve Steinwedel =

American former college basketball coach (born 1953)

Biographical details
- Born: July 18, 1953 (age 73); Seymour, Indiana, U.S.

Playing career
- 1972–1975: Mississippi State

Coaching career (HC unless noted)
- 1976–1977: Stetson (assistant)
- 1977–1978: West Virginia (assistant)
- 1979–1980: Duke (assistant)
- 1980–1985: South Carolina (assistant)
- 1985–1995: Delaware

Head coaching record
- Overall: 163–121 (.574)
- Tournaments: 0–2 (NCAA Division I)

Accomplishments and honors

Championships
- NAC regular season (1992); 2 NAC tournament (1992, 1993)

Awards
- NAC Coach of the Year (1992)

Steve Steinwedel (born July 18, 1953) is an American former college basketball coach who most notably coached for ten seasons at Delaware.

== Coaching career ==
After a player career at Mississippi State, Steinwedel began his coaching career as an assistant at Stetson, before moving on to assistant coaching spots at West Virginia, Duke, and South Carolina. He was named the head coach at Delaware in 1985. During the 1991–92 season, with future NBA Draft selection Spencer Dunkley on the team, Steinwedel led the Fightin' Blue Hens to a school record 27–4 mark, and went an undefeated 14–0 in the North Atlantic Conference en route to the 1992 NCAA Tournament, the first postseason appearance in school history. It was followed up by another tournament appearance in 1993. Despite the success, Steienwedel was forced to resign in 1995.

== Post-coaching career ==
Stienwedel never coached college basketball after leaving Delaware, but stayed in the area working as a counselor. He currently serves as the director and co-founder of the Community for Integrative Learning.

== College coaching record ==
Record table
Season	Team	Overall	Conference	Standing	Postseason
Delaware Fightin' Blue Hens (East Coast Conference) (1985–1991)
1985–86	Delaware	11–16	4–10	8th	
1986–87	Delaware	12–16	3–11	8th	
1987–88	Delaware	19–9	9–5	2nd	
1988–89	Delaware	14–14	6–8	6th	
1989–90	Delaware	16–13	7–7	4th	
1990–91	Delaware	16–13	8–4	2nd	
Delaware Fightin' Blue Hens (North Atlantic Conference) (1991–1995)
1991–92	Delaware	27–4	14–0	1st	NCAA Division I First Round
1992–93	Delaware	22–8	10–4	3rd	NCAA Division I First Round
1993–94	Delaware	14–13	7–7	5th	
1994–95	Delaware	12–15	7–9	7th	
Delaware:		163–121 (.574)	75–65 (.536)		
Total:		163–121 (.574)			
National champion Postseason invitational champion Conference regular season champion Conference regular season and conference tournament champion Division regular season champion Division regular season and conference tournament champion Conference tournament champion
