= 1994 North Atlantic Conference men's basketball tournament =

- Classification: Division I
- Season: 1993–94
- Teams: 8
- Champions: Drexel (1st title)
- Winning coach: Bill Herrion (1st title)
- MVP: Malik Rose (Drexel)
- North Atlantic Conference men's basketball tournaments

1993–94 North Atlantic Conference men's basketball standings
	Conf.				Overall
Team	W		L	PCT	W		L	PCT
Drexel †	12	–	2	.857	25	–	5	.833
Maine	11	–	3	.786	20	–	9	.690
Hartford	9	–	5	.643	16	–	12	.571
New Hampshire	8	–	6	.571	15	–	13	.536
Delaware	7	–	7	.500	14	–	13	.519
Boston University	4	–	10	.286	11	–	16	.407
Vermont	3	–	11	.214	12	–	15	.444
Northeastern	2	–	12	.143	5	–	22	.185
† 1994 NAC tournament winner Rankings from AP poll

The 1994 North Atlantic Conference men's basketball tournament was hosted by the higher seeds in head-to-head matchups. The final was held at Daskalakis Athletic Center on the campus of Drexel University. Drexel gained its first overall America East Conference Championship and an automatic berth to the NCAA tournament with its win over Maine. Drexel was given the 14th seed in the East Regional of the NCAA Tournament and lost in the first round to Temple 61–39.

== Bracket and Results ==
The tournament took place March 5–9.

Quarterfinals
1	Drexel	81
8	Northeastern	71
4	New Hampshire	80
5	Delaware	67
3	Hartford	92
6	Boston University	76
2	Maine	77
7	Vermont	55

Semifinals
1	Drexel	85
4	New Hampshire	75
3	Hartford	74
2	Maine	79

Finals
1	Drexel	86
2	Maine	78

== See also ==
- America East Conference
