= 1992–93 Drexel Dragons men's basketball team =

American college basketball season

1992–93 Drexel Dragons men's basketball

NAC Regular Season Co-Champions
- Conference: North Atlantic Conference
- Record: 22–7 (12–2 NAC)
- Head coach: Bill Herrion (2nd season)
- Assistant coaches: Steve Seymour (2nd season); Walton Fuller (5th season)
- Home arena: Daskalakis Athletic Center

1992–93 North Atlantic Conference men's basketball standings
	Conf.				Overall
Team	W		L	PCT	W		L	PCT
Drexel	12	–	2	.857	22	–	7	.759
Northeastern	12	–	2	.857	20	–	8	.714
Delaware †	10	–	4	.714	22	–	8	.733
Hartford	7	–	7	.500	14	–	14	.500
Maine	4	–	10	.286	10	–	17	.370
New Hampshire	4	–	10	.286	6	–	21	.222
Vermont	4	–	10	.286	10	–	17	.370
Boston University	3	–	11	.214	6	–	21	.222
† 1993 NAC tournament winner Rankings from AP poll

The 1992–93 Drexel Dragons men's basketball team represented Drexel University during the 1992–93 NCAA Division I men's basketball season. The Dragons, led by 2nd year head coach Bill Herrion, played their home games at the Daskalakis Athletic Center and were members of the North Atlantic Conference (NAC).

The team finished the season 22–7, and finished in 1st place in the NAC in the regular season.

== Roster ==
1992–93 Drexel Dragons men's basketball team
Players
Coaches

Pos.	#	Name	Height	Weight	Year	Previous school	Hometown
F		Malik Rose	6 ft 7 in (2.01 m)	—	Fr	Overbrook HS (Philadelphia)	Philadelphia, PA
			—	—

Head coach

- Bill Herrion (Merrimack)

Assistant coach(es)

- Steve Seymour (Bridgewater State)
- Walton Fuller (Drexel)

Legend

- (C) Team captain
- (S) Suspended
- (I) Ineligible
- (W) Walk-on
- Injured
- Current redshirt

== Schedule ==
Date time, TV	Rank^{#}	Opponent^{#}	Result	Record	High points	High rebounds	High assists	Site (attendance) city, state
Regular season
December 1, 1992*		Lehigh	W 86–77	1–0	–	–	–	Daskalakis Athletic Center (1,213); Philadelphia, PA
December 4, 1992*		Army	W 64–50	2–0	–	–	–	Daskalakis Athletic Center (1,186); Philadelphia, PA
December 12, 1992*		at St. Francis (PA)	W 77–66 ^{OT}	3–0	–	23 – Rose	–	(1,142)
December 14, 1992*		Saint Joseph's	L 47–52	3–1	–	–	–	Daskalakis Athletic Center (1,917); Philadelphia, PA
December 19, 1992*		at Youngstown State	W 75–62	4–1	–	–	–	
December 21, 1992*		at Penn State	L 64–73	4–2	–	–	–	Rec Hall (3,212); University Park, Pennsylvania
December 28, 1992*		vs. Alabama State; Shootout Spokane	W 83–75	5–2	–	–	–	Charlotte Y. Martin Centre (2,178); Spokane, WA
December 29, 1992*		at Gonzaga; Shootout Spokane	L 78–91	5–3	–	–	–	Charlotte Y. Martin Centre (3,047); Spokane, WA
January 2, 1993*		at Pepperdine	L 56–69	5–4	–	–	–	(1,307)
January 9, 1993*		at Lafayette	W 72–58	6–4	–	–	–	
January 11, 1993*		Fordham	W 70–65	7–4	–	–	–	Daskalakis Athletic Center (1,812); Philadelphia, PA
January 15, 1993		Maine	L 59–64	7–5 (0–1)	–	–	–	Daskalakis Athletic Center (1,737); Philadelphia, PA
January 17, 1993		New Hampshire	W 73–52	8–5 (1–1)	–	–	–	Daskalakis Athletic Center (883); Philadelphia, PA
January 22, 1993		at Northeastern	W 79–68	9–5 (2–1)	–	–	–	
January 24, 1993		at Boston University	W 75–63	10–5 (3–1)	–	–	–	(1,093)
January 29, 1993		Hartford	W 80–68	11–5 (4–1)	–	–	–	Daskalakis Athletic Center; Philadelphia, PA
January 31, 1993		Vermont	W 85–82 ^{OT}	12–5 (5–1)	–	26 – Rose	–	Daskalakis Athletic Center (980); Philadelphia, PA
February 6, 1993		Delaware	W 79–63	13–5 (6–1)	–	–	–	Daskalakis Athletic Center; Philadelphia, PA
February 8, 1993*		Navy	W 73–57	14–5	–	–	–	
February 11, 1993		at Vermont	W 85–71	15–5 (7–1)	–	25 – Rose	–	(911)
February 13, 1993		at Hartford	W 76–71 ^{OT}	16–5 (8–1)	–	–	–	
February 19, 1993		Boston University	W 71–57	17–5 (9–1)	–	–	–	Daskalakis Athletic Center (1,715); Philadelphia, PA
February 21, 1993		Northeastern	W 79–73	18–5 (10–1)	–	–	–	Daskalakis Athletic Center; Philadelphia, PA
February 26, 1993		at New Hampshire	W 65–63	19–5 (11–1)	–	–	–	(621)
February 28, 1993		at Maine	W 67–57	20–5 (12–1)	–	–	–	(2,204)
March 3, 1993		at Delaware	L 73–92	20–6 (12–2)	–	–	–	Bob Carpenter Center; Newark, DE
NAC tournament
March 6, 1993	(1)	(8) Boston University; Quarterfinal	W 75–58	21–6	–	22 – Rose	–	Daskalakis Athletic Center (1,080); Philadelphia, PA
March 7, 1993	(1)	(4) Hartford; Semifinal	W 91–80	22–6	–	–	–	Daskalakis Athletic Center; Philadelphia, PA
March 8, 1993	(1)	(3) Delaware; Championship	L 64–67	22–7	–	–	–	Daskalakis Athletic Center; Philadelphia, PA
*Non-conference game. ^{#}Rankings from AP. (#) Tournament seedings in parentheses. All times are in Eastern Time.

== Awards ==
Bill Herrion

- North American Conference Coach of the Year
- NAC Player of the Week (2)

Brian Holden

- NAC All-Conference First Team
- NAC All-Tournament Team

Malik Rose

- NAC All-Conference First Team
- NAC All-Rookie Team
- NAC All-Tournament Team
- NAC Rookie of the Week (3)
