= 1993–94 Drexel Dragons men's basketball team =

American college basketball season

1993–94 Drexel Dragons men's basketball

NAC Regular Season Champions NAC Tournament Champions

NCAA tournament first round, L 39–61
- Conference: North Atlantic Conference
- Record: 25–5 (12–2 NAC)
- Head coach: Bill Herrion (3rd season)
- Assistant coaches: Steve Seymour (3rd season); Walton Fuller (6th season)
- Captain: Jim Rullo
- Home arena: Physical Education and Athletic Center

1993–94 North Atlantic Conference men's basketball standings
| | Conf. | | | | Overall |
| Team | W | | L | PCT | W | | L | PCT |
|---|---|---|---|---|---|---|---|---|
| Drexel † | 12 | – | 2 | .857 | 25 | – | 5 | .833 |
| Maine | 11 | – | 3 | .786 | 20 | – | 9 | .690 |
| Hartford | 9 | – | 5 | .643 | 16 | – | 12 | .571 |
| New Hampshire | 8 | – | 6 | .571 | 15 | – | 13 | .536 |
| Delaware | 7 | – | 7 | .500 | 14 | – | 13 | .519 |
| Boston University | 4 | – | 10 | .286 | 11 | – | 16 | .407 |
| Vermont | 3 | – | 11 | .214 | 12 | – | 15 | .444 |
| Northeastern | 2 | – | 12 | .143 | 5 | – | 22 | .185 |
† 1994 NAC tournament winner Rankings from AP poll

The 1993–94 Drexel Dragons men's basketball team represented Drexel University during the 1993–94 NCAA Division I men's basketball season. The Dragons, led by 3rd year head coach Bill Herrion, played their home games at the Physical Education and Athletic Center and were members of the North Atlantic Conference (NAC).

The team finished the season 25–5, and finished in 1st place in the NAC in the regular season.

== Roster ==
1993–94 Drexel Dragons men's basketball team
Players
Coaches

| Pos. | # | Name | Height | Weight | Year | Previous school | Hometown |
|---|---|---|---|---|---|---|---|
| F/C | 00 | Malik Rose | 6 ft 7 in (2.01 m) | 250 lb (113 kg) | So | Overbrook HS (Philadelphia) | Philadelphia, PA |
| | | | — | — |

Head coach

- Bill Herrion (Merrimack)

Assistant coach(es)

- Steve Seymour (Bridgewater State)
- Walton Fuller (Drexel)

Legend

- (C) Team captain
- (S) Suspended
- (I) Ineligible
- (W) Walk-on
- Injured
- Current redshirt

== Schedule ==
| Date time, TV | Rank^{#} | Opponent^{#} | Result | Record | High points | High rebounds | High assists | Site (attendance) city, state |
Regular season
| November 27, 1993* | | Widener | W 90–38 | 1–0 | 17 – Wisler | 13 – Rose | 9 – Overby | Daskalakis Athletic Center (1,107); Philadelphia, PA |
| December 1, 1993* | | at Lehigh | W 73–57 | 2–0 | 16 – Tied | 7 – Hudgins | 5 – Tied | Stabler Arena (1,210); Bethlehem, PA |
| December 3, 1993* | | vs. TCU; Independent Mortgage Classic Semifinals | W 84–71 | 3–0 | 17 – Wisler | 8 – Holden | 5 – Alexander | Alumni Hall (350); Fairfield, CT |
| December 4, 1993* | | at Fairfield; Independent Mortgage Classic Championship | W 73–60 | 4–0 | 17 – Rose | 16 – Rose | 5 – Overby | Alumni Hall (2,006); Fairfield, CT |
| December 8, 1993* | | Rider | W 88–57 | 5–0 | 20 – Wisler | 16 – Rose | 7 – Alexander | Daskalakis Athletic Center (1,490); Philadelphia, PA |
| December 20, 1993* | | at Saint Joseph's | L 64–65 ^{OT} | 5–1 | 15 – Rullo | 18 – Rose | 5 – Rullo | Hagan Arena (3,200); Philadelphia, PA |
| December 22, 1993* | | Monmouth | W 90–72 | 6–1 | 26 – Holden | 16 – Rose | 10 – Rullo | Daskalakis Athletic Center (789); Philadelphia, PA |
| December 29, 1993* | | vs. Saint Peter's; Pepsi–Marist Tournament semifinals | W 80–72 | 7–1 | 19 – Tied | 7 – Wisler | 5 – Rullo | McCann Field House (1,729); Poughkeepsie, NY |
| December 30, 1993* | | at Marist; Pepsi–Marist Tournament Championship | W 75–65 | 8–1 | 25 – Holden | 10 – Tied | 4 – Rullo | McCann Field House (1,967); Poughkeepsie, NY |
| January 4, 1994* | | UMBC | W 81–67 | 9–1 | 18 – Alexander | 13 – Rose | 7 – Rullo | Daskalakis Athletic Center (542); Philadelphia, PA |
| January 10, 1994* | | at Army | L 67–70 | 9–2 | 19 – Rose | 17 – Rose | 4 – Holden | Christl Arena (572); West Point, NY |
| January 11, 1994* | | at Rutgers | W 76–64 | 10–2 | 26 – Holden | 11 – Tied | 6 – Rullo | Louis Brown Athletic Center (2,745); Piscataway, NJ |
| January 14, 1994 | | at Maine | W 72–68 | 11–2 (1–0) | 16 – Wisler | 10 – Rose | 4 – Rullo | Alfond Arena (1,172); Orono, ME |
| January 16, 1994 | | at New Hampshire | W 70–57 | 12–2 (2–0) | 20 – Hudgins | 10 – Hudgins | 7 – Overby | Lundholm Gym (1,150); Durham, NH |
| January 21, 1994 | | Northeastern | W 89–52 | 13–2 (3–0) | 15 – Rose | 16 – Rose | 10 – Rullo | Daskalakis Athletic Center (1,759); Philadelphia, PA |
| January 23, 1994 | | Boston University | W 88–73 | 14–2 (4–0) | 24 – Rullo | 7 – Tied | 5 – Tied | Daskalakis Athletic Center (1,397); Philadelphia, PA |
| January 27, 1994 | | at Hartford | L 60–77 | 14–3 (4–1) | 14 – Rullo | 19 – Rose | 5 – Rullo | Chase Arena (2,011); Hartford, CT |
| January 29, 1994 | | at Vermont | W 100–87 | 15–3 (5–1) | 23 – Rose | 15 – Rose | 4 – Tied | Patrick Gym (1,085); Burlington, VT |
| February 5, 1994; 7:30 pm | | at Delaware | W 74–67 | 16–3 (6–1) | 16 – Wisler | 13 – Rose | 3 – 3 Tied | Bob Carpenter Center (4,208); Newark, DE |
| February 11, 1994 | | Vermont | W 63–54 | 17–3 (7–1) | 28 – Holden | 22 – Rose | 4 – Holden | Daskalakis Athletic Center (1,263); Philadelphia, PA |
| February 13, 1994 | | Hartford | W 81–62 | 18–3 (8–1) | 27 – Wisler | 16 – Rose | 6 – Tied | Daskalakis Athletic Center (1,609); Philadelphia, PA |
| February 18, 1994 | | at Boston University | W 73–63 | 19–3 (9–1) | 21 – Holden | 14 – Rose | 6 – Holden | Case Gym (1,351); Boston, MA |
| February 20, 1994 | | at Northeastern | W 71–64 | 20–3 (10–1) | 23 – Holden | 8 – Rose | 4 – Tied | Matthews Arena (782); Boston, MA |
| February 25, 1994 | | New Hampshire | W 81–62 | 21–3 (11–1) | 16 – Wisler | 10 – Rose | 6 – Holden | Daskalakis Athletic Center (1,566); Philadelphia, PA |
| February 27, 1994 | | Maine | L 73–79 ^{OT} | 20–4 (11–2) | 17 – Tied | 13 – Rose | 7 – Holden | Daskalakis Athletic Center (1,316); Philadelphia, PA |
| March 2, 1994 | | Delaware | W 68–60 ^{OT} | 22–4 (12–2) | 19 – Rose | 16 – Rose | 7 – Tied | Daskalakis Athletic Center (1,890); Philadelphia, PA |
NAC tournament
| March 5, 1994 | (1) | (8) Northeastern; Quarterfinal | W 81–71 | 23–4 | 24 – Rose | 9 – Rose | 7 – Alexander | Daskalakis Athletic Center (817); Philadelphia, PA |
| March 7, 1994 | (1) | (4) New Hampshire; Semifinal | W 85–75 | 24–4 | 24 – Holden | 16 – Rose | 6 – Tied | Daskalakis Athletic Center (932); Philadelphia, PA |
| March 9, 1994; ESPN | (1) | (2) Maine; Championship | W 86–78 | 25–4 | 19 – Rose | 15 – Rose | 10 – Holden | Daskalakis Athletic Center (2,300); Philadelphia, PA |
1994 NCAA Division I men's basketball tournament
| March 18, 1994*; 7:33 pm | (13 E) | vs. (4 E) No. 12 Temple; Round of 64 | L 39–61 | 25–5 | 9 – Overby | 7 – Overby | 6 – Holden | USAir Arena (18,667); Landover, MD |
*Non-conference game. ^{#}Rankings from AP. (#) Tournament seedings in parentheses. E=East. All times are in Eastern Time.

== Rankings ==
Ranking movement Legend: ██ Increase in ranking. ██ Decrease in ranking. ██ Not ranked the previous week. RV=Others receiving votes.
| Poll | Pre | Wk 2 | Wk 3 | Wk 4 | Wk 5 | Wk 6 | Wk 7 | Wk 8 | Wk 9 | Wk 10 | Wk 11 | Wk 12 | Wk 13 | Wk 14 | Wk 15 | Wk 16 | Wk 17 | Post | Final |
|---|---|---|---|---|---|---|---|---|---|---|---|---|---|---|---|---|---|---|---|
| AP | | | | | | | | | | | | | | | | | | | N/A |
| Coaches | | | | | | | | | | | | | | RV | | | | | |

== Awards ==
Brian Holden

- NAC All-Conference First Team
- NAC All-Tournament Team

Malik Rose

- NAC Tournament Most Valuable Player
- NAC All-Conference First Team
- NAC Player of the Week
