= 1996 North Atlantic Conference men's basketball tournament =

1996 America East men's basketball tournament
- Classification: Division I
- Season: 1995–96
- Teams: 10
- Champions: Drexel (3rd title)
- Winning coach: Bill Herrion (3rd title)
- MVP: Malik Rose (Drexel)

1995–96 North Atlantic Conference men's basketball standings
	Conf.				Overall
Team	W		L	PCT	W		L	PCT
Drexel †	17	–	1	.944	27	–	4	.871
Boston University	13	–	5	.722	18	–	11	.621
Maine	11	–	7	.611	15	–	13	.536
Delaware	11	–	7	.611	15	–	12	.556
Towson State	11	–	7	.611	16	–	12	.571
Vermont	10	–	8	.556	12	–	15	.444
Hofstra	5	–	13	.278	9	–	18	.333
New Hampshire	5	–	13	.278	6	–	21	.222
Hartford	5	–	13	.278	6	–	22	.214
Northeastern	2	–	16	.111	4	–	24	.143
† 1996 NAC tournament winner Rankings from AP poll

The 1996 America East men's basketball tournament was hosted by the Delaware Blue Hens at Bob Carpenter Center. The final was held at Daskalakis Athletic Center on the campus of Drexel University. Drexel gained its third consecutive America East Conference Championship and an automatic berth to the NCAA tournament with its win over Boston University. Drexel was given the 12th seed in the West Regional of the NCAA Tournament, defeated Memphis in the first round 75–63, and lost in the second round to Syracuse 69–58.

== Bracket and results ==
First round
8	New Hampshire	73
9	Hartford	76
7	Hofstra	61
10	Northeastern	71

Second round
1	Drexel	83
9	Hartford	71
4	Delaware	78
5	Towson State	85
2	Boston U.	69
10	Northeastern	54
3	Maine	84
6	Vermont	75

Semifinals
1	Drexel	84
5	Towson State	74
2	Boston U.	66
3	Maine	64

Finals
1	Drexel	76
2	Boston U.	67

== See also ==
- America East Conference
