= 1991–92 Drexel Dragons men's basketball team =

American college basketball season

1991–92 Drexel Dragons men's basketball
- Conference: North Atlantic Conference
- Record: 16–14 (9–5 NAC)
- Head coach: Bill Herrion (1st season)
- Assistant coaches: Steve Seymour (1st season); Walton Fuller (4th season)
- Home arena: Daskalakis Athletic Center

1991–92 North Atlantic Conference men's basketball standings
	Conf.				Overall
Team	W		L	PCT	W		L	PCT
Delaware †	14	–	0	1.000	27	–	4	.871
Drexel	9	–	5	.643	16	–	14	.533
Maine	8	–	6	.571	17	–	15	.531
Vermont	7	–	7	.500	16	–	13	.552
Northeastern	5	–	9	.357	9	–	19	.321
Boston University	5	–	9	.357	10	–	18	.357
New Hampshire	5	–	9	.357	7	–	21	.250
Hartford	3	–	11	.214	6	–	21	.222
† 1992 NAC tournament winner Rankings from AP poll

The 1991–92 Drexel Dragons men's basketball team represented Drexel University during the 1991–92 NCAA Division I men's basketball season. The Dragons, led by 1st year head coach Bill Herrion, played their home games at the Daskalakis Athletic Center and were members of the North Atlantic Conference (NAC).

The team finished the season 16–14, and finished in 2nd place in the NAC in the regular season.

== Roster ==
1991–92 Drexel Dragons men's basketball team
Players	Coaches
Pos. / # / Name / Height / Weight / Year / Previous school / Hometown; / / / — / —	Head coach: Bill Herrion (Merrimack); Assistant coach(es): Steve Seymour (Bridgewater State); Walton Fuller (Drexel); Legend: (C) Team captain; (S) Suspended; (I) Ineligible; (W) Walk-on; Injured; Current redshirt

== Schedule ==
Date time, TV	Rank^{#}	Opponent^{#}	Result	Record	High points	High rebounds	High assists	Site (attendance) city, state
Regular season
November 25, 1991*		at Lehigh	L 92–98	0–1	–	–	–	Stabler Arena (1,525); Bethlehem, PA
November 29, 1991*		vs. Saint Mary's (CA); Joseph Lapchick Memorial Tournament semifinal	W 70–64 ^{OT}	1–1	–	–	–	Alumni Hall (5,266); Jamaica, NY
November 30, 1991*		at No. 8 St. John's; Joseph Lapchick Memorial Tournament final	L 61–81	1–2	–	–	–	Alumni Hall (5,431); Jamaica, NY
December 3, 1991*		at Saint Joseph's	L 79–94	1–3	–	–	–	(2,925)
December 18, 1991*		vs. Penn State	L 65–80	1–4	–	–	–	Palestra (3,113); Philadelphia, PA
December 21, 1991*		Saint Francis (PA)	L 73–83	1–5	–	–	–	Daskalakis Athletic Center; Philadelphia, PA
December 27, 1991*		vs. Georgia State; Mount St. Mary's Holiday Tournament	L 59–75	1–6	–	–	–	Knott Arena; Emmitsburg, MD
December 28, 1991*		vs. Maryland Eastern Shore; Mount St. Mary's Holiday Tournament	W 87–56	2–6	–	–	–	Knott Arena (500); Emmitsburg, MD
January 17, 1992		at Maine	W 55–50	– (–)	–	–	–	(3,153)
January 25, 1992		Boston University	W 107–77	–	–	–	17 – Armstrong	Daskalakis Athletic Center (1,031); Philadelphia, PA
February 1, 1992		at Hartford	W 69–63	– (–)	–	–	–	(1,238)
February 10, 1992*		Youngstown State	W 73–63		–	–	–	Daskalakis Athletic Center (602); Philadelphia, PA
February 26, 1992*		Bucknell	W 92–81		–	–	–	Daskalakis Athletic Center (1,104); Philadelphia, PA
February 29, 1992		Maine	W 57–55	– (–)	–	–	–	Daskalakis Athletic Center (1,849); Philadelphia, PA
March 4, 1992		Delaware	L 66–72	– (–)	–	–	–	Delaware Field House; Newark, DE
NAC tournament
March 7, 1992	(2)	(7) New Hampshire; Quarterfinal	W 78–72	–	–	–	–	Daskalakis Athletic Center (673); Philadelphia, PA
March 8, 1992	(2)	(3) Maine; Semifinal	W 97–79	–	–	–	–	Daskalakis Athletic Center (800); Philadelphia, PA
March 9, 1992	(2)	at (1) Delaware; Championship	L 68–92	–	–	–	–	Delaware Field House (2,864); Newark, DE
*Non-conference game. ^{#}Rankings from AP. (#) Tournament seedings in parentheses. All times are in Eastern Time.

== Awards ==
Clarence Armstrong

- NAC All-Tournament Team

Jonathan Raab

- NAC All-Conference Second Team
- NAC Player of the Week

Michael Thompson

- NAC All-Conference First Team
- NAC All-Tournament Team
- NAC Player of the Week
