= 1994–95 Drexel Dragons men's basketball team =

American college basketball season

1994–95 Drexel Dragons men's basketball

NAC Regular Season Champions NAC Tournament Champions

NCAA tournament first round, L 49–73
- Conference: North Atlantic Conference
- Record: 22–8 (12–4 NAC)
- Head coach: Bill Herrion (4th season)
- Assistant coaches: Steve Seymour (4th season); Monté Ross (1st season)
- Home arena: Daskalakis Athletic Center

1994–95 North Atlantic Conference men's basketball standings
	Conf.				Overall
Team	W		L	PCT	W		L	PCT
Drexel †	12	–	4	.750	22	–	8	.733
New Hampshire	11	–	5	.688	19	–	9	.679
Northeastern	10	–	6	.625	18	–	11	.621
Hartford	7	–	9	.438	11	–	16	.407
Boston University	7	–	9	.438	15	–	16	.484
Vermont	7	–	9	.438	14	–	13	.519
Delaware	7	–	9	.438	12	–	15	.444
Maine	6	–	10	.375	11	–	16	.407
Hofstra	5	–	11	.313	10	–	18	.357
† 1995 NAC tournament winner Rankings from AP poll

The 1994–95 Drexel Dragons men's basketball team represented Drexel University during the 1994–95 NCAA Division I men's basketball season. The Dragons, led by 4th year head coach Bill Herrion, played their home games at the Daskalakis Athletic Center and were members of the North Atlantic Conference (NAC).

The team finished the season 22–8, and finished in 1st place in the NAC in the regular season.

== Roster ==
1994–95 Drexel Dragons men's basketball team
Players
Coaches

Pos.	#	Name	Height	Weight	Year	Previous school	Hometown
C	00	Malik Rose	6 ft 7 in (2.01 m)	250 lb (113 kg)	Jr	Overbrook HS (Philadelphia)	Philadelphia, PA
PG		Leland Redmond	5 ft 11 in (1.8 m)	—	Fr	Willowridge HS	Houston, TX
C	55	Jason Yoder	6 ft 10 in (2.08 m)	—	Fr
F		Chuck Guittar (redshirt)	6 ft 9 in (2.06 m)	—	Jr	Paul VI HS/New Haven	Audubon, NJ
			—	—

Head coach

- Bill Herrion (Merrimack)

Assistant coach(es)

- Steve Seymour (Bridgewater State)
- Monté Ross (Winston-Salem State)

Legend

- (C) Team captain
- (S) Suspended
- (I) Ineligible
- (W) Walk-on
- Injured
- Current redshirt

== Schedule ==
Date time, TV	Rank^{#}	Opponent^{#}	Result	Record	High points	High rebounds	High assists	Site (attendance) city, state
Regular season
November 28, 1994*		at Ohio State	L 74–81	0–1	21 – Rose	12 – Rose	8 – Holden	St. John Arena (8,545); Columbus, OH
December 3, 1994*		at Monmouth	W 69–53	1–1	18 – Myers	17 – Rose	6 – Myers	William T. Boylan Gymnasium (2,259); West Long Branch, NJ
December 7, 1994*		UMBC	W 64–48	2–1	19 – Holden	9 – Rose	5 – Myers	Daskalakis Athletic Center (521); Philadelphia, PA
December 10, 1994*		at Rider	W 68–64	3–1	29 – Holden	21 – Rose	3 – Rose	Alumni Gymnasium (1,640); Lawrenceville, NJ
December 17, 1994*		at Fordham	W 64–57	4–1	17 – Holden	7 – Rose	5 – Redmond	Rose Hill Gymnasium (1,023); Bronx, NY
December 19, 1994*		Navy	W 82–64	5–1	25 – Holden	14 – Rose	5 – Redmond	Daskalakis Athletic Center (618); Philadelphia, PA
December 29, 1994*		vs. Charleston; Dr. Pepper Classic semifinals	L 51–56	5–2	–	–	–	McKenzie Arena (4,429); Chattanooga, TN
December 30, 1994*		vs. Liberty; Dr. Pepper Classic consolation	W 89–68	6–2	–	–	–	McKenzie Arena (5,200); Chattanooga, TN
January 9, 1995*		Lehigh	W 86–63	7–2	–	–	–	Daskalakis Athletic Center (1,361); Philadelphia, PA
January 13, 1995		Maine	W 71–50	8–2 (1–0)	–	–	–	Daskalakis Athletic Center (1,350); Philadelphia, PA
January 15, 1995		New Hampshire	W 90–72	9–2 (2–0)	–	–	–	Daskalakis Athletic Center (641); Philadelphia, PA
January 17, 1995*		vs. Saint Joseph's	L 73–78	9–3	–	–	–	Palestra (8,722); Philadelphia, PA
January 20, 1995		at Northeastern	L 76–87	9–4 (2–1)	24 – Holden	13 – Rose	4 – Holden	Matthews Arena (1,145); Boston, MA
January 22, 1995		at Boston University	W 63–51	10–4 (3–1)	–	–	–	Case Gym (1,612); Boston, MA
January 25, 1995		Hofstra	W 90–64	11–4 (4–1)	–	20 – Rose	–	Daskalakis Athletic Center (945); Philadelphia, PA
January 27, 1995		Hartford	W 59–49	12–4 (5–1)	16 – Rose	19 – Rose	4 – Holden	Daskalakis Athletic Center (1,574); Philadelphia, PA
January 29, 1995		Vermont	W 108–78	13–4 (6–1)	23 – Rose	15 – Rose	4 – Tied	Daskalakis Athletic Center (1,144); Philadelphia, PA
February 3, 1995; 7:00 pm		Delaware	W 76–69	14–4 (7–1)	–	–	–	Daskalakis Athletic Center (1,680); Philadelphia, PA
February 5, 1995; 2:00 pm		at Hofstra	W 96–88	15–4 (8–1)	33 – Rose	19 – Rose	3 – Redmond	Hofstra Physical Fitness Center (1,263); Hempstead, NY
February 9, 1995		at Vermont	L 65–68	15–5 (8–2)	–	–	–	Patrick Gym (1,380); Burlington, VT
February 11, 1995		at Hartford	W 75–65	16–5 (9–2)	–	–	–	Chase Arena (1,594); Hartford, CT
February 17, 1995		Boston University	W 79–70	17–5 (10–2)	–	–	–	Daskalakis Athletic Center (1,528); Philadelphia, PA
February 19, 1995		Northeastern	W 75–57	18–5 (11–2)	–	–	–	Daskalakis Athletic Center (1,276); Philadelphia, PA
February 24, 1995		at New Hampshire	W 83–74	19–5 (12–2)	–	–	–	Lundholm Gym (3,250); Durham, NH
February 26, 1995		at Maine	L 74–81	19–6 (12–3)	–	–	–	Alfond Arena (2,020); Orono, ME
February 28, 1995		at Delaware	L 71–73	19–7 (12–4)	–	–	–	Bob Carpenter Center (3,795); Newark, DE
NAC tournament
March 4, 1995	(1)	(9) Hofstra; Quarterfinals	W 108–75	20–7	30 – Rose	15 – Rose	11 – Myers	Daskalakis Athletic Center (833); Philadelphia, PA
March 6, 1995	(1)	(5) Boston University; Semifinals	W 62–53	21–7	18 – Holden	8 – Rose	4 – Tied	Daskalakis Athletic Center (1,017); Philadelphia, PA
March 8, 1995; 9:30 pm	(1)	(3) Northeastern; Championship	W 72–52	22–7	21 – Rose	13 – Rose	6 – Overby	Daskalakis Athletic Center (2,139); Philadelphia, PA
1995 NCAA Division I men's basketball tournament
March 16, 1995; CBS	(13 E)	vs. (4 E) No. 19 Oklahoma State; First round	L 49–73	22–8	17 – Rose	18 – Rose	4 – Myers	Baltimore Arena (12,816); Baltimore, MD
*Non-conference game. ^{#}Rankings from AP. (#) Tournament seedings in parentheses. E=East. All times are in Eastern Time.

== Awards ==
Bill Herrion

- NAC Coach of the Year

Brian Holden

- NAC All-Conference First Team
- NAC All-Tournament Team
- NAC Player of the Week (2)

Leland Redmond

- NAC All-Rookie Team

Malik Rose

- NAC Player of the Year
- NAC All-Conference First Team
- NAC Tournament Most Valuable Player
- NAC All-Tournament Team
- NAC Player of the Week
