= NBA Development League Executive of the Year =

NBA Development League Executive of the Year may refer to:

- NBA Development League Basketball Executive of the Year Award
- NBA Development League Team Executive of the Year Award
