= 1992–93 Delaware Fightin' Blue Hens men's basketball team =

American college basketball season

1992–93 Delaware Fightin' Blue Hens men's basketball

NAC tournament champions

NCAA tournament
- Conference: North Atlantic Conference
- Record: 22–8 (10–4 NAC)
- Head coach: Steve Steinwedel (8th season)
- Home arena: Delaware Field House

1992–93 North Atlantic Conference men's basketball standings
	Conf.				Overall
Team	W		L	PCT	W		L	PCT
Drexel	12	–	2	.857	22	–	7	.759
Northeastern	12	–	2	.857	20	–	8	.714
Delaware †	10	–	4	.714	22	–	8	.733
Hartford	7	–	7	.500	14	–	14	.500
Maine	4	–	10	.286	10	–	17	.370
New Hampshire	4	–	10	.286	6	–	21	.222
Vermont	4	–	10	.286	10	–	17	.370
Boston University	3	–	11	.214	6	–	21	.222
† 1993 NAC tournament winner Rankings from AP poll

The 1992–93 Delaware Fightin' Blue Hens men's basketball team represented the University of Delaware during the 1992–93 NCAA Division I men's basketball season. The Fightin' Blue Hens, led by eighth-year head coach Steve Steinwedel, played their home games at the Delaware Field House and were members of the North Atlantic Conference. They finished the season 22–8, 10–4 in NAC play to finish third in the conference regular season standings. They were champions of the NAC tournament to earn an automatic bid to the NCAA tournament where they lost in the opening round to No. 4 seed Louisville.

== Roster ==
1992–93 Delaware Fightin' Blue Hens men's basketball team
Players	Coaches
Pos. / # / Name / Height / Weight / Year / Hometown; C / / Spencer Dunkley / 6 ft 10 in (2.08 m) / 225 lb (102 kg) / Sr / Newark, Delaware	Head coach: Steve Steinwedel (Mississippi State); Assistant coach(es) Legend: (C) Team captain; (S) Suspended; (I) Ineligible; (W) Walk-on; Injured; Current redshirt

== Schedule and results ==
Date time, TV	Rank^{#}	Opponent^{#}	Result	Record	Site (attendance) city, state
Regular season
Nov 19, 1992*		at No. 6 Seton Hall; Preseason NIT	L 54–75	0–1	Brendan Byrne Arena (12,523); East Rutherford, New Jersey
Dec 1, 1992*		Rutgers	W 77–69	1–1	Bob Carpenter Center (3,558); Newark, Delaware
Dec 3, 1992*		Widener	W 84–55	2–1	Bob Carpenter Center (2,825); Newark, Delaware
Dec 8, 1992*		at Bucknell	L 71–83	2–2	Davis Gym (2,500); Lewisburg, Pennsylvania
Dec 10, 1992*		at Delaware State	W 81–64	3–2	Memorial Hall (3,199); Dover, Delaware
Dec 18, 1992*		vs. Xavier; Daiwa NCAA Ball Tournament	L 66–74	3–3	Tokyo Metropolitan Gymnasium (10,000); Tokyo, Japan
Dec 19, 1992*		vs. Rice; Daiwa NCAA Ball Tournament	W 71–65	4–3	Tokyo Metropolitan Gymnasium; Tokyo, Japan
Dec 29, 1992*		vs. UNC Greensboro; Mount St. Mary's Tournament	W 67–60	5–3	Knott Arena (1,200); Emmitsburg, Maryland
Dec 30, 1992*		at Mount St. Mary's; Mount St. Mary's Tournament	W 73–55	6–3	Knott Arena (2,180); Emmitsburg, Maryland
Jan 4, 1993*		Navy	W 79–58	7–3	Bob Carpenter Center (4,184); Newark, Delaware
Jan 6, 1993*		Maryland–Baltimore County	W 106–98 ^{OT}	8–3	Bob Carpenter Center (2,702); Newark, Delaware
Jan 9, 1993*		at Towson State	W 76–69	9–3	Towson Center (1,325); Towson, Maryland
Jan 15, 1993		New Hampshire	W 65–54	10–3 (1–0)	Bob Carpenter Center (3,508); Newark, Delaware
Jan 17, 1993		Maine	W 93–71	11–3 (2–0)	Bob Carpenter Center (3,242); Newark, Delaware
Jan 22, 1993		at Boston University	W 70–69	12–3 (3–0)	Walter Brown Arena (1,016); Boston, Massachusetts
Jan 24, 1993		at Northeastern	L 73–76	12–4 (3–1)	Matthews Arena (1,380); Boston, Massachusetts
Jan 29, 1993		Vermont	W 73–69	13–4 (4–1)	Bob Carpenter Center (3,800); Newark, Delaware
Jan 31, 1993		Hartford	W 71–67	14–4 (5–1)	Bob Carpenter Center (3,552); Newark, Delaware
Feb 6, 1993		at Drexel	L 63–79	14–5 (5–2)	Daskalakis Athletic Center (2,000); Philadelphia, Pennsylvania
Feb 11, 1993		at Hartford	W 69–65	15–5 (6–2)	Sports Center (2,091); Hartford, Connecticut
Feb 13, 1993		at Vermont	W 88–73	16–5 (7–2)	Patrick Gym (1,026); Burlington, Vermont
Feb 19, 1993		Northeastern	L 68–82	16–6 (7–3)	Bob Carpenter Center (4,982); Newark, Delaware
Feb 21, 1993		Boston University	W 83–65	17–6 (8–3)	Bob Carpenter Center (4,074); Newark, Delaware
Feb 26, 1993		at Maine	W 78–72	18–6 (9–3)	Alfond Sports Arena (1,712); Orono, Maine
Feb 28, 1993		at New Hampshire	L 62–64	18–7 (9–4)	Lundholm Gym (1,008); Durham, New Hampshire
Mar 3, 1993		Drexel	W 92–73	19–7 (10–4)	Bob Carpenter Center (5,000); Newark, Delaware
NAC tournament
Mar 6, 1993*	(3)	(6) New Hampshire; Quarterfinals	W 70–65	20–7	Bob Carpenter Center (2,921); Newark, Delaware
Mar 8, 1993*	(3)	at (2) Northeastern; Semifinals	W 84–61	21–7	Matthews Arena (1,350); Boston, Massachusetts
Mar 10, 1993*	(3)	at (1) Drexel; Championship game	W 67–64	22–7	Daskalakis Athletic Center (1,600); Philadelphia, Pennsylvania
NCAA tournament
Mar 19, 1993*	(13 MW)	vs. (4 MW) No. 15 Louisville; First Round	L 70–76	22–8	RCA Dome (31,186); Indianapolis, Indiana
*Non-conference game. ^{#}Rankings from AP Poll. (#) Tournament seedings in parentheses. MW=Midwest. All times are in Eastern Time.

== Players in the 1993 NBA draft ==
Round	Pick	Player	NBA club
2	51	Spencer Dunkley	Indiana Pacers
