= 1998–99 Drexel Dragons men's basketball team =

American college basketball season

1998–99 Drexel Dragons men's basketball

AEC Regular Season Co-Champions
- Conference: America East Conference
- Record: 20–9 (15–3 AEC)
- Head coach: Bill Herrion (8th season)
- Assistant coach: Steve Seymour (8th season)
- Home arena: Daskalakis Athletic Center

1998–99 America East Conference men's basketball standings
| | Conf. | | | | Overall |
| Team | W | | L | PCT | W | | L | PCT |
|---|---|---|---|---|---|---|---|---|
| Delaware † | 15 | – | 3 | .833 | 25 | – | 6 | .806 |
| Drexel | 15 | – | 3 | .833 | 20 | – | 9 | .690 |
| Hofstra | 14 | – | 4 | .778 | 22 | – | 10 | .688 |
| Maine | 13 | – | 5 | .722 | 19 | – | 9 | .679 |
| Hartford | 9 | – | 9 | .500 | 11 | – | 16 | .407 |
| Vermont | 7 | – | 11 | .389 | 11 | – | 16 | .407 |
| Northeastern | 6 | – | 12 | .333 | 10 | – | 18 | .357 |
| Boston University | 5 | – | 13 | .278 | 9 | – | 18 | .333 |
| Towson | 4 | – | 14 | .222 | 6 | – | 22 | .214 |
| New Hampshire | 2 | – | 16 | .111 | 4 | – | 23 | .148 |
† 1999 America East tournament winner Rankings from AP poll

The 1998–99 Drexel Dragons men's basketball team represented Drexel University during the 1998–99 NCAA Division I men's basketball season. The Dragons, led by 8th year head coach Bill Herrion, played their home games at the Daskalakis Athletic Center and were members of the America East Conference (AEC).

The team finished the season 20–9, and finished in 1st place in the AEC in the regular season.

== Roster ==
1998–99 Drexel Dragons men's basketball team
| Players | Coaches |
|---|---|
| Pos. / # / Name / Height / Weight / Year / Previous school / Hometown; / / / — / — | Head coach: Bill Herrion (Merrimack); Assistant coach(es): Steve Seymour (Bridgewater State); Legend: (C) Team captain; (S) Suspended; (I) Ineligible; (W) Walk-on; Injured; Current redshirt |

== Schedule ==
| Date time, TV | Rank^{#} | Opponent^{#} | Result | Record | High points | High rebounds | High assists | Site (attendance) city, state |
Regular season
| November 18, 1998* | | at Seton Hall | L 70–83 | 0–1 | – | – | – | Continental Airlines Arena (6,073); East Rutherford, NJ |
| Unknown* | | vs. Air Force | L 50–56 | 2–4 | – | – | – | Brown County Arena (3,500); Green Bay, WI |
| Unknown* | | vs. Texas Southern | W 71–56 | 3–4 | – | – | – | Brown County Arena (861); Green Bay, WI |
| January 21, 1999* | | at Penn; Battle of 33rd Street | L 65–75 | | – | – | – | Palestra (4,652); Philadelphia, PA |
| February 18, 1999* | | vs. Saint Joseph's | L 51–59 | | – | – | – | Palestra (6,218); Philadelphia, PA |
AEC tournament
| | (2) | vs. (7) Northeastern; Quarterfinals | W 64–56 | 19–8 | – | – | – | Bob Carpenter Center (3,205); Newark, DE |
| February 28, 1999 | (2) | vs. (3) Hofstra; Semifinals | W 55–37 | 20–8 | – | – | – | Bob Carpenter Center (5,209); Newark, DE |
| March 6, 1999 | (2) | at (1) Delaware; Championship | L 67–86 | 20–9 | – | – | – | Bob Carpenter Center (5,209); Newark, DE |
*Non-conference game. ^{#}Rankings from AP. (#) Tournament seedings in parentheses. All times are in Eastern Time.

== Awards ==
Bill Herrion

- America East Conference Coach of the Year

Bryant Coursey

- AEC All-Championship Team
- AEC Player of the Week

Mike DeRocckis

- AEC All-Conference Second Team

Mike Kouser

- AEC All-Conference Second Team

Joe Linderman

- AEC All-Conference First Team
- AEC All-Championship Team
