= 1995–96 Drexel Dragons men's basketball team =

American college basketball season

1995–96 Drexel Dragons men's basketball

NAC regular season and tournament champions

NCAA tournament, second round
- Conference: North Atlantic Conference
- Record: 27–4 (17–1 NAC)
- Head coach: Bill Herrion (5th season)
- Assistant coaches: Steve Seymour (5th season); Monté Ross (2nd season); John O’Connor (3rd season)
- Captains: Malik Rose; Jeff Myers
- Home arena: Daskalakis Athletic Center

1995–96 North Atlantic Conference men's basketball standings
	Conf.				Overall
Team	W		L	PCT	W		L	PCT
Drexel †	17	–	1	.944	27	–	4	.871
Boston University	13	–	5	.722	18	–	11	.621
Maine	11	–	7	.611	15	–	13	.536
Delaware	11	–	7	.611	15	–	12	.556
Towson State	11	–	7	.611	16	–	12	.571
Vermont	10	–	8	.556	12	–	15	.444
Hofstra	5	–	13	.278	9	–	18	.333
New Hampshire	5	–	13	.278	6	–	21	.222
Hartford	5	–	13	.278	6	–	22	.214
Northeastern	2	–	16	.111	4	–	24	.143
† 1996 NAC tournament winner Rankings from AP poll

The 1995–96 Drexel Dragons men's basketball team represented Drexel University during the 1995–96 NCAA Division I men's basketball season. The Dragons, led by 5th year head coach Bill Herrion, played their home games at the Daskalakis Athletic Center and were members of the North Atlantic Conference (which has since changed name).

In the 1995–96 season, the Dragons won a school record 27 games, won the North Atlantic Conference men's basketball tournament for the third season in a row, qualified for the NCAA tournament for the fourth time in school history, and also won the school's first ever NCAA Tournament game in the first round of the 1996 NCAA Division I men's basketball tournament.

Drexel accomplished a 21 game home winning streak, dating back to the 1993–94 season, ending in a loss against Boston University on January 26.

After reaching the Round of 32 in the NCAA Tournament for the first time in program history, the Dragons lost to Syracuse by a score of 58–69. Syracuse would go on to finish runner–up in the tournament, losing to Kentucky in the National Championship.

In the 1995–96 season, Malik Rose broke Drexel's individual single season record for rebounds with 409 in 31 games.

== Offseason ==
=== Departures ===
Name	Number	Pos.	Height	Weight	Year	Hometown	Notes
Leland Redmond		G	5'11"		Freshman	Houston, TX	Transferred to Texas Southern
Jason Yoder	55	C	6'10"		Freshman		Signed to the Philadelphia Phillies

=== 1995 recruiting class ===
College recruiting information
Name	Hometown	School	Height	Weight	Commit date
Mike DeRocckis; C	Spotswood, NJ	McCorristin Catholic High School	6 ft 2 in (1.88 m)	180 lb (82 kg)	
Mike DeRocckis; C	Recruit ratings: No ratings found				
Ross Neisler; G	Norwalk, CT	Norwalk High School	6 ft 3 in (1.91 m)	N/A	
Ross Neisler; G	Recruit ratings: No ratings found				
Overall recruit ranking:
Note: In many cases, Scout, Rivals, 247Sports, On3, and ESPN may conflict in their listings of height and weight.; In these cases, the average was taken. ESPN grades are on a 100-point scale.; Sources: "Drexel 1995 Basketball Commitments". Rivals.; "Drexel Dragons". ESPN.; "1995 Team Ranking". Rivals.

== Roster ==
1995–96 Drexel Dragons men's basketball team
Players
Coaches

Pos.	#	Name	Height	Weight	Year	Previous school	Hometown
F/C	00	Malik Rose (C)	6 ft 7 in (2.01 m)	250 lb (113 kg)	Sr	Overbrook HS (Philadelphia)	Philadelphia, PA
G	3	Dimitris Stefanidis	6 ft 4 in (1.93 m)	—	So	Filothei	Athens, Greece
G	5	Greg Gaffney	5 ft 8 in (1.73 m)	—	Fr	Christian Brothers Academy	Lincroft, NJ
G	15	Mike DeRocckis	6 ft 2 in (1.88 m)	180 lb (82 kg)	Fr	McCorristin HS	Spotswood, NJ
G	21	Ross Neisler	6 ft 3 in (1.91 m)	—	Fr	Norwalk HS (CT)	Norwalk, CT
F	23	David Frey	6 ft 7 in (2.01 m)	—	Jr	Rockhurst HS	Kansas City, MO
G	24	Jeff Myers (C)	6 ft 2 in (1.88 m)	—	RS Jr	South Philadelphia HS/St. Francis (NY)	Philadelphia, PA
F	30	George Hudgins	6 ft 6 in (1.98 m)	—	Sr	Chattanooga Arts & Sciences	Chattanooga, TN
G	31	Cornelius Overby	6 ft 0 in (1.83 m)	—	Sr	Herbert H. Lehman HS	Bronx, NY
F	33	Brahin Riley	6 ft 7 in (2.01 m)	—	So	Northeast HS (Philadelphia)	Philadelphia, PA
G/F	34	Karl Fischer (W)	6 ft 3 in (1.91 m)	—	RS Jr	Newtown HS (CT)	Newtown, CT
F	44	John Randall (W)	6 ft 5 in (1.96 m)	—	Fr	Woodrow Wilson HS (NJ)	Camden, NJ
F	55	Chuck Guittar	6 ft 9 in (2.06 m)	—	RS Jr	Paul VI HS/New Haven	Audubon, NJ

Head coach

- Bill Herrion (Merrimack)

Assistant coach(es)

- Steve Seymour (Bridgewater State)
- Monté Ross (Winston-Salem State)
- John O’Connor (Penn State)

Legend

- (C) Team captain
- (S) Suspended
- (I) Ineligible
- (W) Walk-on
- Injured
- Current redshirt

Roster

== Schedule ==
Date time, TV	Rank^{#}	Opponent^{#}	Result	Record	High points	High rebounds	High assists	Site (attendance) city, state
Regular season
November 27, 1995*; 7:00 pm		Saint Anselm	W 82–59	1–0	–	–	–	Daskalakis Athletic Center (1,112); Philadelphia, PA
December 1, 1995*; 9:00 pm		vs. Murray State; Purdue Tournament semifinals	L 75–76	1–1	–	–	–	Mackey Arena (14,123); West Lafayette, IN
December 2, 1995*; 6:00 pm		vs. Illinois–Chicago; Purdue Tournament 3rd place game	W 83–72	2–1	–	–	–	Mackey Arena (14,123); West Lafayette, IN
December 7, 1995; 7:30 pm		at Vermont	W 97–58	3–1 (1–0)	–	–	–	Patrick Gym (1,825); Burlington, VT
December 9, 1995; 2:00 pm		at Hartford	W 79–72 ^{OT}	4–1 (2–0)	–	–	–	Chase Arena (568); Hartford, CT
December 23, 1995*; 7:00 pm		at Oklahoma	L 78–85	4–2	–	–	–	Lloyd Noble Center (8,562); Norman, OK
December 29, 1995*; 8:00 pm		vs. James Madison; Bobcat Holiday Stores Classic semifinals	W 75–55	5–2	21 – DeRocckis	17 – Rose	3 – Myers	Worthington Arena (6,407); Bozeman, MT
December 30, 1995*; 10:00 pm		at Montana State; Bobcat Holiday Stores Classic championship	W 68–62	6–2	–	–	–	Worthington Arena (6,611); Bozeman, MT
January 6, 1996; 3:30 pm		at Hofstra	W 100–71	7–2 (3–0)	20 – Myers	11 – Rose	–	Hofstra Physical Fitness Center (1,623); Hempstead, NY
January 8, 1996*; 7:30 pm		at Lehigh	Postponed (Blizzard of 96)					Stabler Arena; Bethlehem, PA
January 11, 1996; 7:00 pm		New Hampshire	W 110–68	8–2 (4–0)	–	–	–	Daskalakis Athletic Center (802); Philadelphia, PA
January 13, 1996; 1:00 pm		Maine	W 88–70	9–2 (5–0)	–	–	–	Daskalakis Athletic Center (1,216); Philadelphia, PA
January 16, 1996; 9:00 pm		vs. Delaware	W 91–75	10–2 (6–0)	–	–	–	CoreStates Spectrum (7,877); Philadelphia, PA
January 18, 1996; 7:00 pm		at Northeastern	W 87–65	11–2 (7–0)	27 – Rose	–	–	Matthews Arena (610); Boston, MA
January 20, 1996; 1:00 pm		at Boston University	W 67–47	12–2 (8–0)	24 – Rose	8 – Overby	6 – Myers	Case Gym (1,634); Boston, MA
January 26, 1996; 7:00 pm		Boston University	L 74–76	12–3 (8–1)	28 – Rose	21 – Rose	6 – Overby	Daskalakis Athletic Center (2,147); Philadelphia, PA
January 28, 1996; 1:00 pm		Northeastern	W 84–47	13–3 (9–1)	25 – Myers	9 – Myers	7 – Myers	Daskalakis Athletic Center (1,323); Philadelphia, PA
February 2, 1996; 7:30 pm		at New Hampshire	W 87–75	14–3 (10–1)	35 – Myers	11 – Myers	4 – Myers	Lundholm Gym (1,790); Durham, NH
February 4, 1996; 12:00 pm		Maine	W 73–52	15–3 (11–1)	20 – Rose	12 – Rose	5 – Myers	Alfond Arena (2,316); Orono, ME
February 7, 1996; 8:00 pm		Towson State	W 96–87	16–3 (12–1)	25 – Rose	14 – Rose	4 – Guittar	Daskalakis Athletic Center (2,006); Philadelphia, PA
February 10, 1996; 8:00 pm		Hofstra	W 93–63	17–3 (13–1)	29 – Rose	11 – Rose	6 – Overby	Daskalakis Athletic Center (2,300); Philadelphia, PA
February 12, 1996*		at Lehigh; Rescheduled from January 8th	W 93–73	18–3	27 – Rose	20 – Rose	5 – Myers	Stabler Arena (508); Bethlehem, PA
February 16, 1996; 7:30 pm		at Towson State	W 75–56	19–3 (14–1)	–	–	–	Towson Center (1,950); Towson, MD
February 18, 1996; 3:15 pm		at Delaware	W 82–78	20–3 (15–1)	34 – Rose	–	–	Bob Carpenter Center (4,640); Newark, DE
February 20, 1996*; 7:00 pm	No. RV	at UMBC	W 87–55	21–3	–	–	–	Retriever Activities Center (626); Catonsville, MD
February 23, 1996; 7:00 pm	No. RV	Vermont	W 86–59	22–3 (16–1)	–	–	–	Daskalakis Athletic Center (2,201); Philadelphia, PA
February 25, 1996; 1:00 pm	No. RV	Hartford	W 74–56	23–3 (17–1)	–	–	–	Daskalakis Athletic Center (2,120); Philadelphia, PA
1996 North Atlantic Conference men's basketball tournament
March 2, 1996; 2:00 pm	(1)	vs. (9) Hartford; Quarterfinal	W 73-62	24–3	–	–	–	Bob Carpenter Center (4,786); Newark, DE
March 3, 1996; 1:00 pm	(1)	vs. (5) Towson State; Semifinal	W 84–74	25–3	–	–	–	Bob Carpenter Center (3,970); Newark, DE
March 7, 1996; 5:00 pm, ESPN2	(1)	(2) Boston University; Championship	W 76–67	26–3	22 – Rose	19 – Rose	5 – Myers	Daskalakis Athletic Center (2,300); Philadelphia, PA
1996 NCAA Division I men's basketball tournament
March 14, 1996*; CBS	(12 W)	vs. (5 W) No. 16 Memphis; First Round	W 75–63	27–3	21 – Rose	15 – Rose	5 – Myers	The Pit (14,762); Albuquerque, NM
March 16, 1996*; 7:00 pm, CBS	(12 W)	vs. (4 W) No. 13 Syracuse; Second Round	L 58–69	27–4	18 – Myers	15 – Rose	2 – 3 Tied	The Pit (15,792); Albuquerque, NM
*Non-conference game. ^{#}Rankings from AP. (#) Tournament seedings in parentheses. W=West. All times are in Eastern Time.

== Rankings ==
Ranking movement Legend: ██ Increase in ranking. ██ Decrease in ranking. ██ Not ranked the previous week. RV=Others receiving votes.
Poll	Pre	Wk 2	Wk 3	Wk 4	Wk 5	Wk 6	Wk 7	Wk 8	Wk 9	Wk 10	Wk 11	Wk 12	Wk 13	Wk 14	Wk 15	Wk 16	Wk 17	Post	Final
AP															RV	RV	RV	RV	N/A
Coaches								RV	RV		RV	RV	RV	RV	RV	RV	RV	RV	RV

== Awards ==
Bill Herrion

- NAC Coach of the Year

Mike Derocckis

- NAC Rookie of the Year
- NAC All-Rookie Team
- NAC Rookie of the Week (4)

Jeff Myers

- NAC All-Conference First Team
- NAC All-Tournament Team
- NAC Player of the Week

Cornelius Overby

- NAC All-Tournament Team

Malik Rose

- NAC Player of the Year
- NAC Tournament Most Valuable Player
- NAC All-Conference First Team
- NAC Player of the Week (2)
