= 1998–99 Delaware Fightin' Blue Hens men's basketball team =

American college basketball season

1998–99 Delaware Fightin' Blue Hens men's basketball

America East regular season champions America East tournament champions

NCAA tournament
- Conference: America East Conference
- Record: 25–6 (15–3 AEC)
- Head coach: Mike Brey (4th season)
- Assistant coach: Kenny Blakeney
- Home arena: Delaware Field House

1998–99 America East Conference men's basketball standings
	Conf.				Overall
Team	W		L	PCT	W		L	PCT
Delaware †	15	–	3	.833	25	–	6	.806
Drexel	15	–	3	.833	20	–	9	.690
Hofstra	14	–	4	.778	22	–	10	.688
Maine	13	–	5	.722	19	–	9	.679
Hartford	9	–	9	.500	11	–	16	.407
Vermont	7	–	11	.389	11	–	16	.407
Northeastern	6	–	12	.333	10	–	18	.357
Boston University	5	–	13	.278	9	–	18	.333
Towson	4	–	14	.222	6	–	22	.214
New Hampshire	2	–	16	.111	4	–	23	.148
† 1999 America East tournament winner Rankings from AP poll

The 1998–99 Delaware Fightin' Blue Hens men's basketball team represented the University of Delaware during the 1998–99 NCAA Division I men's basketball season. The Fightin' Blue Hens, led by fourth-year head coach Mike Brey, played their home games at the Delaware Field House and were members of the America East Conference. They finished the season 25–6, 15–3 in AEC play to finish atop the conference regular season standings. They were champions of the AEC tournament to earn an automatic bid to the NCAA tournament where they lost in the opening round to No. 4 seed Tennessee.

== Roster ==
1998–99 Delaware Fightin' Blue Hens men's basketball team
Players
Coaches

Pos.	#	Name	Height	Weight	Year	Hometown
G	3	Tyrone Perry	5 ft 11 in (1.8 m)	175 lb (79 kg)	Sr	Newport News, Virginia
F	5	Mike Pegues	6 ft 5 in (1.96 m)	230 lb (104 kg)	Jr	Washington, D.C.
F	22	Darryl Presley	6 ft 6 in (1.98 m)	215 lb (98 kg)	Jr
C		John Bennett	6 ft 10 in (2.08 m)	225 lb (102 kg)	Sr

Head coach

- Mike Brey (George Washington)

Assistant coach(es)

- Kenny Blakeney (Duke)

Legend

- (C) Team captain
- (S) Suspended
- (I) Ineligible
- (W) Walk-on
- Injured
- Current redshirt

== Schedule and results ==
Date time, TV	Rank^{#}	Opponent^{#}	Result	Record	Site (attendance) city, state
Regular season
Dec 27, 1998*		at Virginia	L 64–72	8–2	University Hall (7,059); Charlottesville, Virginia
America East tournament
Feb 27, 1999*		Towson; Quarterfinals	W 83–63	23–5	Bob Carpenter Center (5,209); Newark, Delaware
Feb 28, 1999*		Maine; Semifinals	W 90–73	24–5	Bob Carpenter Center (5,209); Newark, Delaware
Mar 6, 1999*		Drexel; Championship game	W 86–67	25–5	Bob Carpenter Center (5,209); Newark, Delaware
NCAA tournament
Mar 12, 1999*	(13 E)	vs. (4 E) No. 20 Tennessee; First round	L 52–62	25–6	Charlotte Coliseum (15,007); Charlotte, North Carolina
*Non-conference game. ^{#}Rankings from AP Poll. (#) Tournament seedings in parentheses. E=East. All times are in Eastern Time.
