= 1993 North Atlantic Conference men's basketball tournament =

- Classification: Division I
- Season: 1992–93
- Teams: 8
- Site: Daskalakis Athletic Center; Philadelphia, Pennsylvania
- Champions: Delaware (2nd title)
- Winning coach: Steve Steinwedel (2nd title)
- MVP: Kevin Blackhurst (Delaware)
- North Atlantic Conference men's basketball tournaments

1992–93 North Atlantic Conference men's basketball standings
	Conf.				Overall
Team	W		L	PCT	W		L	PCT
Drexel	12	–	2	.857	22	–	7	.759
Northeastern	12	–	2	.857	20	–	8	.714
Delaware †	10	–	4	.714	22	–	8	.733
Hartford	7	–	7	.500	14	–	14	.500
Maine	4	–	10	.286	10	–	17	.370
New Hampshire	4	–	10	.286	6	–	21	.222
Vermont	4	–	10	.286	10	–	17	.370
Boston University	3	–	11	.214	6	–	21	.222
† 1993 NAC tournament winner Rankings from AP poll

The 1993 North Atlantic Conference men's basketball tournament was hosted by the higher seeds in head-to-head matchups. The final was held at Daskalakis Athletic Center on the campus of Drexel University. Delaware gained its second consecutive and second overall America East Conference Championship and an automatic berth to the NCAA tournament with its win over Drexel. Delaware was given the 13th seed in the Midwest Regional of the NCAA Tournament and lost in the first round to Louisville 76–70.

== Bracket and Results ==
Quarterfinals
1	Drexel	75
8	Boston U.	58
4	Hartford	59
5	Maine	49
3	Delaware	70
6	New Hampshire	65
2	Northeastern	91
7	Vermont	68

Semifinals
1	Drexel	91
4	Hartford	80
3	Delaware	84
2	Northeastern	64

Finals
1	Drexel	64
3	Delaware	67

== See also ==
- America East Conference
