= 1999 America East men's basketball tournament =

- Classification: Division I
- Season: 1998–99
- Champions: Delaware (4th title)
- Winning coach: Mike Brey (2nd title)
- MVP: John Gordon (Delaware)

1998–99 America East Conference men's basketball standings
	Conf.				Overall
Team	W		L	PCT	W		L	PCT
Delaware †	15	–	3	.833	25	–	6	.806
Drexel	15	–	3	.833	20	–	9	.690
Hofstra	14	–	4	.778	22	–	10	.688
Maine	13	–	5	.722	19	–	9	.679
Hartford	9	–	9	.500	11	–	16	.407
Vermont	7	–	11	.389	11	–	16	.407
Northeastern	6	–	12	.333	10	–	18	.357
Boston University	5	–	13	.278	9	–	18	.333
Towson	4	–	14	.222	6	–	22	.214
New Hampshire	2	–	16	.111	4	–	23	.148
† 1999 America East tournament winner Rankings from AP poll

The 1999 America East men's basketball tournament was hosted by the Delaware Blue Hens at Bob Carpenter Center . The final was also held at Bob Carpenter Center. Delaware gained its second consecutive America East Conference Championships and an automatic berth to the NCAA tournament with its win over Drexel. Delaware was given the 13th seed in the East Regional of the NCAA Tournament and lost in the first round to Tennessee 62–52. Hofstra University gained a bid to the NIT and lost in the first round to Rutgers 58–45.

== Bracket and Results ==
First round
8	Boston University	58
9	Towson	71
7	Northeastern	77
10	New Hampshire	69

Second round
1	Delaware	83
9	Towson	63
4	Maine	76
5	Hartford	71
2	Drexel	64
7	Northeastern	56
3	Hofstra	69
6	Vermont	59

Semifinals
1	Delaware	90
4	Maine	73
2	Drexel	55
3	Hofstra	37

Finals
1	Delaware	86
2	Drexel	67

== See also ==
- America East Conference
