= 1991–92 Delaware Fightin' Blue Hens men's basketball team =

American college basketball season

1991–92 Delaware Fightin' Blue Hens men's basketball

NAC Regular Season & Tournament Champions

NCAA tournament
- Conference: North Atlantic Conference
- Record: 27–4 (14–0 NAC)
- Head coach: Steve Steinwedel (7th season)
- Home arena: Delaware Field House

1991–92 North Atlantic Conference men's basketball standings
	Conf.				Overall
Team	W		L	PCT	W		L	PCT
Delaware †	14	–	0	1.000	27	–	4	.871
Drexel	9	–	5	.643	16	–	14	.533
Maine	8	–	6	.571	17	–	15	.531
Vermont	7	–	7	.500	16	–	13	.552
Northeastern	5	–	9	.357	9	–	19	.321
Boston University	5	–	9	.357	10	–	18	.357
New Hampshire	5	–	9	.357	7	–	21	.250
Hartford	3	–	11	.214	6	–	21	.222
† 1992 NAC tournament winner Rankings from AP poll

The 1991–92 Delaware Fightin' Blue Hens men's basketball team represented the University of Delaware during the 1991–92 NCAA Division I men's basketball season. The Fightin' Blue Hens, led by seventh-year head coach Steve Steinwedel, played their home games at the Delaware Field House and were members of the North Atlantic Conference. They finished the season 27–4, 14–0 in NAC play to win the conference regular season championship. They were also champions of the NAC tournament to earn an automatic bid to the NCAA tournament – the first appearance in school history – where they lost in the opening round to eventual Final Four participant Cincinnati.

== Roster ==
1991–92 Delaware Fightin' Blue Hens men's basketball team
Players
Coaches

Pos.	#	Name	Height	Weight	Year	Hometown
F	32	Anthony Wright	6 ft 6 in (1.98 m)	208 lb (94 kg)	Jr	Asbury Park, New Jersey
F	34	Alex Coles	6 ft 6 in (1.98 m)	190 lb (86 kg)	Sr	Richmond, Virginia

Head coach

- Steve Steinwedel (Mississippi State)

Assistant coach(es)

Legend

- (C) Team captain
- (S) Suspended
- (I) Ineligible
- (W) Walk-on
- Injured
- Current redshirt

== Schedule and results ==
Date time, TV	Rank^{#}	Opponent^{#}	Result	Record	Site (attendance) city, state
Regular season
Mar 4, 1992		Drexel	W 72–66	24–3 (14–0)	Delaware Field House (2,561); Newark, Delaware
NAC tournament
Mar 7, 1992*		Hartford; Quarterfinals	W 92–56	25–3	Delaware Field House (2,699); Newark, Delaware
Mar 9, 1992*		Vermont; Semifinals	W 76–64	26–3	Delaware Field House (2,524); Newark, Delaware
Mar 11, 1992*		Drexel; Championship Game	W 92–68	27–3	Delaware Field House (2,864); Newark, Delaware
NCAA tournament
Mar 20, 1992*	(13 MW)	vs. (4 MW) No. 12 Cincinnati; First Round	L 47–85	27–4	University of Dayton Arena; Dayton, Ohio
*Non-conference game. ^{#}Rankings from AP Poll. (#) Tournament seedings in parentheses. MW=Midwest. All times are in Eastern Time.
