= 2008 NBA Development League expansion draft =

General information
- Sport: Basketball
- Date: September 24, 2008
- Location: New York, New York

Overview
- League: NBA
- Expansion teams: Reno Bighorns; Erie BayHawks

The 2008 NBA Development League expansion draft was the third expansion draft of the National Basketball Association Development League (NBADL). The draft was held on September 24, 2008, so that the newly founded Reno Bighorns and Erie BayHawks could acquire players for the upcoming 2008–09 season.

A random drawing determined who was awarded the first pick, which went to the Reno Bighorns. The teams switched their draft order each succeeding round. The available players to draft came from a list of 55 unprotected players who had competed in the NBADL in 2007–08.

The first overall draft pick in the expansion draft was Damone Brown, a 6 ft 9 in (2.06 m) guard who had played for the Sioux Falls Skyforce the season before. Brown had played collegiately at Syracuse and then spent three years playing professional basketball before his 2008 NBADL Expansion Draft selection. He was also one of three players to have also been chosen in an NBA draft (2001); the others include Randy Livingston (1996) and Dahntay Jones (2003). Two players, Livingston and Brian Chase, had previously been selected as NBA Development League All-Stars. Chase was a 2007 All-Star, while Livingston earned the honor in 2008. The only non-American player chosen was Mustafa Al-Sayyad, who was born in Khartoum, Sudan and played college basketball at Fresno State.

== Key ==
Pos.	G	F	C
Position	Guard	Forward	Center

^	Denotes player who has been selected to (an) NBA Development League All-Star Game(s)
*	Denotes player who has been selected to (an) NBA Development League All-Star Game(s) and was also selected in an NBA draft
†	Denotes player who was also selected in an NBA Draft

== Draft ==
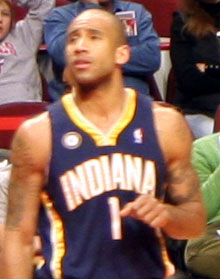
Dahntay Jones was drafted eighth overall by the Reno Bighorns.

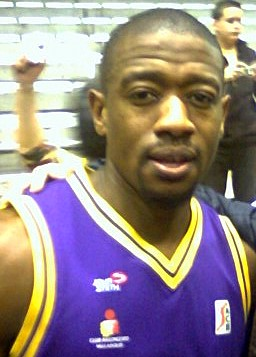
Brian Chase, also a Bighorns selection, was taken 16th overall.

Round	Pick	Player	Pos.	Nationality	Team	College
1	1	Damone Brown^{†}	G/F	United States	Reno Bighorns	Syracuse
1	2	Mike Gansey	G	United States	Erie BayHawks	West Virginia
2	3	Tony Gipson	G	United States	Erie BayHawks	LSU
2	4	Jackie Manuel	G	United States	Reno Bighorns	North Carolina
3	5	Jesse Smith	C	United States	Reno Bighorns	Idaho State
3	6	Kris Lang	F/C	United States	Erie BayHawks	North Carolina
4	7	Jamaal Thomas	F	United States	Erie BayHawks	Angelo State
4	8	Dahntay Jones^{†}	G	United States	Reno Bighorns	Duke
5	9	Andre Patterson	F	United States	Reno Bighorns	Tennessee
5	10	Steven Smith	F	United States	Erie BayHawks	La Salle
6	11	Davin White	G	United States	Erie BayHawks	Cal State Northridge
6	12	Cecil Brown	G	United States	Reno Bighorns	Santa Barbara
7	13	Mustafa Al-Sayyad	F	Sudan	Reno Bighorns	Fresno State
7	14	Brian Greene	F	United States	Erie BayHawks	Colorado State
8	15	Kyle Davis	F/C	United States	Erie BayHawks	Auburn
8	16	Brian Chase^{^}	G	United States	Reno Bighorns	Virginia Tech
9	17	Alfred Neale	F	United States	Reno Bighorns	New Mexico
9	18	Jeff Hagen	C	United States	Erie BayHawks	Minnesota
10	19	Larry Turner	C	United States	Erie BayHawks	Tennessee State
10	20	Randy Livingston*	G	United States	Reno Bighorns	LSU
