= 1997–98 Drexel Dragons men's basketball team =

American college basketball season

1997–98 Drexel Dragons men's basketball
- Conference: America East Conference
- Record: 13–15 (10–8 AEC)
- Head coach: Bill Herrion (7th season)
- Assistant coach: Steve Seymour (7th season)
- Home arena: Daskalakis Athletic Center

1997–98 America East Conference men's basketball standings
	Conf.				Overall
Team	W		L	PCT	W		L	PCT
Delaware †	12	–	6	.667	20	–	10	.667
Boston University	12	–	6	.667	19	–	11	.633
Vermont	11	–	7	.611	16	–	11	.593
Hartford	11	–	7	.611	15	–	12	.556
Hofstra	11	–	7	.611	19	–	12	.613
Drexel	10	–	8	.556	13	–	15	.464
Northeastern	9	–	9	.500	14	–	14	.500
New Hampshire	6	–	12	.333	10	–	17	.370
Towson	4	–	14	.222	8	–	20	.286
Maine	4	–	14	.222	7	–	20	.259
† 1998 America East tournament winner Rankings from AP poll

The 1997–98 Drexel Dragons men's basketball team represented Drexel University during the 1997–98 NCAA Division I men's basketball season. The Dragons, led by 7th year head coach Bill Herrion, played their home games at the Daskalakis Athletic Center and were members of the America East Conference (AEC).

The team finished the season 13–15, and finished in 5th place in the AEC in the regular season.

== Roster ==
1997–98 Drexel Dragons men's basketball team
Players	Coaches
Pos. / # / Name / Height / Weight / Year / Previous school / Hometown; / / / — / —	Head coach: Bill Herrion (Merrimack); Assistant coach(es): Steve Seymour (Bridgewater State); Legend: (C) Team captain; (S) Suspended; (I) Ineligible; (W) Walk-on; Injured; Current redshirt

== Schedule ==
Date time, TV	Rank^{#}	Opponent^{#}	Result	Record	High points	High rebounds	High assists	Site (attendance) city, state
Regular season
November 29, 1997*		at Monmouth	W 57–51	1–0	–	–	–	
December 3, 1997		Delaware	W 65–63	2–0 (1–0)	–	–	–	Daskalakis Athletic Center; Philadelphia, PA
December 6, 1997		at Towson	W 65–60	3–0 (2–0)	–	–	–	Towson Center (1,146); Towson, MD
December 14, 1997*		at Notre Dame	L 70–78	3–1	–	–	–	Edmund P. Joyce Center (9.175); Notre Dame, IN
December 20, 1997*		vs. La Salle	W 75–70	4–1	15 – DeRocckis	7 – DeRocckis	–	Palestra (3,251); Philadelphia, PA
December 26, 1997*; 7:00 pm		vs. No. 18 Princeton; ECAC Holiday Festival Semifinals	L 56–58	4–2	17 – Sanders	8 – Linderman	5 – Coursey	Madison Square Garden (9,565); New York, NY
December 27, 1997*		at St. John's (NY); ECAC Holiday Festival Third Place Game	L 46–75	4–3	–	–	–	Madison Square Garden (9,921); New York, NY
January 7, 1998*		at Richmond	L 57–66	5–5	–	–	–	Robins Center; Richmond, VA
January 20, 1998*		at Penn; Battle of 33rd Street	L 65–79	6–9	–	–	–	Palestra (4,010); Philadelphia, PA
February 3, 1998; CN8		Towson	W 72–71	9–10	27 – Linderman	–	–	Daskalakis Athletic Center (1,326); Philadelphia, PA
February 5, 1998*		vs. Saint Joseph's	L 65–76	9–11	–	–	–	Palestra (4,126); Philadelphia, PA
February 21, 1998		at New Hampshire	W 90–65	11–14 (9–8)	–	–	–	(600)
February 22, 1998		New Hampshire	W 75–66	12–14 (10–8)	–	–	–	Daskalakis Athletic Center (1,359); Philadelphia, PA
AEC tournament
February 28, 1998	(6)	vs. (3) Vermont; Quarterfinals	W 51–42	13–14	–	–	–	Bob Carpenter Center (2,461); Newark, DE
March 1, 1998	(6)	vs. (2) Boston University; Semifinals	L 51–53	13–15	–	–	–	Bob Carpenter Center (4,047); Newark, DE
*Non-conference game. ^{#}Rankings from AP. (#) Tournament seedings in parentheses. All times are in Eastern Time.

== Awards ==
Mike DeRocckis

- AEC All-Conference Second Team
- AEC Player of the Week

Joe Linderman

- AEC All-Conference First Team
- AEC All-Championship Team
- AEC Player of the Week

Petrick Sanders

- AEC All-Rookie Team
- AEC Rookie of the Week

Stephen Starks

- AEC Rookie of the Week
