= Mike Gansey =

American basketball player & executive (born 1982)

Philadelphia 76ers
- Position: President of basketball operations
- League: NBA

Personal information
- Born: December 21, 1982 (age 43)
- Listed height: 6 ft 4 in (1.93 m)
- Listed weight: 188 lb (85 kg)

Career information
- High school: Olmsted Falls (Olmsted Falls, Ohio)
- College: St. Bonaventure (2001–2003); West Virginia (2003–2006)
- NBA draft: 2006: undrafted
- Playing career: 2006–2011

Career history
- 2007–2008: Indesit Fabriano
- 2008: Anaheim Arsenal
- 2008–2009: Eisbaren Bremerhaven
- 2009: Erie BayHawks
- 2009–2010: Idaho Stampede
- 2010–2011: CB 1939 Canarias

Career highlights
- As executive: NBA D-League Executive of the Year (2017)
Medals
Men's basketball
Representing United States
Summer Universiade
Gold medal – first place	2005 Izmir	National team

Michael Patrick Gansey (born December 21, 1982) is an American professional basketball executive and former player who is the president of basketball operations for the Philadelphia 76ers of the National Basketball Association (NBA). He previously served as general manager of the Cleveland Cavaliers.

== High school career ==
Gansey, who grew up in the Cleveland, Ohio suburb of Olmsted Falls, was a three-time All-State player at Olmsted Falls High School, including first-team honors in his final two years. He is the school's all-time leading scorer at 1,909 points for his career. In his senior season, he averaged 27.2 points, 10.5 rebounds, 3.2 assists, and 3.3 steals per game, and was named the state's Division II Player of the Year, finishing second in Mr. Basketball voting behind LeBron James. He then began his college career at St. Bonaventure University.

== College career ==
=== St. Bonaventure (2001–2003) ===
In Gansey's freshman season of 2001–02, he averaged 8.3 points and 4.7 rebounds, mainly coming off the bench, and was named to the all-newcomer team in the Atlantic 10 Conference. The following season (2002–03), he became a regular starter, averaging 13.9 points and 5.0 rebounds, and also shooting just over 40% from three-point range. However, the St. Bonaventure basketball program would be rocked by an academic scandal during that season, when it was revealed that a junior-college transfer had been admitted to the university by virtue of a welding certificate. With NCAA sanctions hanging over the program, several players, including Gansey, jumped ship immediately after that season. Once he announced his intention to transfer, he was pursued especially hard by WVU coach John Beilein, who was coaching in the A-10 at Richmond during Gansey's freshman year at St. Bonaventure. Gansey would enroll at West Virginia University.

=== West Virginia (2003–2006) ===
After sitting out the 2003–04 season as required under NCAA transfer rules, Gansey entered the Mountaineers' starting lineup. During the summer of 2004, the team toured Europe (all Division I teams are allowed one offseason overseas trip every four years); Gansey scored 22 points in his first game as a Mountaineer, against the Netherlands national team. He went on to lead the Mountaineers in scoring on the tour at 15.5 points per game.

In his first season at WVU, he averaged 12.0 points and 5.1 rebounds, leading the team in rebounds and becoming a crowd favorite for his hustling play. During a strong late-season run, Gansey and teammate Kevin Pittsnogle were the main keys to turning the Mountaineers from an NCAA tournament "bubble team" to a regional finalist that lost its bid for the Final Four in overtime against Louisville. In the Round of 32, the then-junior guard/forward led the team to a double overtime victory over #2 seeded Wake Forest and future NBA star Chris Paul with 29 points overall. He shot 56% from the field (9/16 FG) with two threes made as well as hitting 9-of-12 free throw attempts. During the offseason, Gansey played on the gold medal-winning USA team at the World University Games in Turkey.

The 2005–06 season promised to be a big season for the Mountaineers, who were returning four of their starting five and virtually all their roster. As the Mountaineers were reaching heights in the national rankings they had not seen since the early 1980s and gaining a level of national publicity they had last seen in the days of Jerry West in the late 1950s, Gansey stepped up his game to a new level. As of February 9, 2006, he was averaging 18.5 points while taking fewer than 12 shots per game, and adding 5.5 rebounds per game. More remarkably, Gansey was shooting 59.7% from the field, making him the only player in NCAA Division I under 6 ft 5 in (1.96 m) in the top 50 in the nation in field-goal percentage. WVU made the Sweet 16 of the 2006 NCAA Tournament before losing to the Texas Longhorns on a buzzer-beating 3 pointer.

Gansey had the 18th highest career scoring average at WVU (14.35), the ninth best field goal percentage in a career (52.6%), the third best 3-point field goal percentage in a career (39.4%), the seventh most steals per game in a career (1.75) and the 12th most minutes per game in a career (32.12). Gansey was named First-team All Big-East as well as an AP Honorable Mention All-American. He was one of ten finalists for the Oscar Robertson Award, a finalist for the Wooden Award, as well as a finalist for the Naismith Trophy.

== Professional career ==
Although it was speculated that he may get drafted as high as late first round in the 2006 NBA draft, Gansey, along with his West Virginia teammate Kevin Pittsnogle, went undrafted. He signed as an undrafted free agent with the Miami Heat in July 2006, and played in summer league games, but was waived before the season. Mike was waived after having a life-threatening staph infection that limited his play.

Gansey played for the Los Angeles Clippers on their 2007 NBA Vegas Summer League team. After the summer league was over, he signed a contract for the 2007–08 season with the Italian team Indesit Fabriano.

On September 24, 2008, Gansey was selected by the Erie BayHawks with the first overall pick in the 2008 NBA D-League expansion draft. However, he went to Germany and played for Eisbaren Bremerhaven in the top division of the BBL.

On November 5, 2009, Gansey was drafted by the Idaho Stampede in the 2009 D-league draft. In 2009–10, he played in Chengdu, China, during the NBA China Challenge. Later in the season, he signed with Ciudad de La Laguna Canarias of the LEB Oro.

== Executive career ==
On April 13, 2017, Gansey was named the NBA Development League's Basketball Executive of the Year, as selected by his fellow NBA G League basketball executives. As general manager of the Canton Charge, Gansey presided over a Charge team that amassed a 29–21 regular season record, securing Canton's sixth-consecutive trip to the NBA D-League postseason as the fourth seed in the Eastern Conference. Hired as the team's general manager prior to the 2015–16 season, Gansey held a leadership role in the Charge's front office since 2012.

On July 26, 2017, Gansey was promoted to assistant general manager of the Cleveland Cavaliers, serving under GM Koby Altman.

On February 23, 2022, Gansey was promoted to general manager of the Cavaliers, serving under president of basketball operations Koby Altman.

On May 29, 2026, Gansey agreed to terms to become the President of Basketball Operations for the Philadelphia 76ers. He was able to work with interim President and former Warriors general manager Bob Myers within the 76ers' new organizational structure. At the outset of his first offseason, Gansey acquired 2024 Finals MVP forward Jaylen Brown from the Boston Celtics in exchange for veteran Paul George—Philadelphia's previous blockbuster acquisition—and draft compensation. On July 24th, the team's signing of LeBron James ultimately reunited the former state of Ohio high school basketball stars, with both also having clear ties to the Cavaliers franchise; Gansey was serving as Canton's general manager while James led Cleveland to the NBA Championship in 2016.

== Personal life ==
One of Gansey's brothers, Steve Gansey, played NCAA Division II basketball for the Ashland Eagles, after playing his freshman and sophomore years with the Division I Cleveland State Vikings.
