= 1998 America East men's basketball tournament =

- Classification: Division I
- Season: 1997–98
- Site: Delaware
- Champions: Delaware (3rd title)
- Winning coach: Mike Brey (1st title)
- MVP: Darryl Presley (Delaware)

1997–98 America East Conference men's basketball standings
	Conf.				Overall
Team	W		L	PCT	W		L	PCT
Delaware †	12	–	6	.667	20	–	10	.667
Boston University	12	–	6	.667	19	–	11	.633
Vermont	11	–	7	.611	16	–	11	.593
Hartford	11	–	7	.611	15	–	12	.556
Hofstra	11	–	7	.611	19	–	12	.613
Drexel	10	–	8	.556	13	–	15	.464
Northeastern	9	–	9	.500	14	–	14	.500
New Hampshire	6	–	12	.333	10	–	17	.370
Towson	4	–	14	.222	8	–	20	.286
Maine	4	–	14	.222	7	–	20	.259
† 1998 America East tournament winner Rankings from AP poll

The 1998 America East men's basketball tournament was hosted by the Delaware Blue Hens at Bob Carpenter Center. The final was also held at Bob Carpenter Center. Delaware gained its third overall America East Conference Championships and an automatic berth to the NCAA tournament with its win over Boston University. Delaware was given the 15th seed in the Midwest Regional of the NCAA Tournament and lost in the first round to Purdue 95–56.

== Bracket and results ==
First round
8	New Hampshire	65
9	Towson	67
7	Northeastern	74
10	Maine	54

Second round
1	Delaware	80
9	Towson	60
4	Hartford	79
5	Hofstra	90
2	Boston U.	87
7	Northeastern	77
3	Vermont	42
6	Drexel	51

Semifinals
1	Delaware	60
5	Hofstra	51
2	Boston U.	53
6	Drexel	51

Finals
1	Delaware	66
2	Boston U.	58

== See also ==
- America East Conference
