= 1997–98 Delaware Fightin' Blue Hens men's basketball team =

American college basketball season

1997–98 Delaware Fightin' Blue Hens men's basketball

America East regular season champions America East tournament champions

NCAA tournament
- Conference: America East Conference
- Record: 20–10 (12–6 AEC)
- Head coach: Mike Brey (3rd season)
- Assistant coach: Kenny Blakeney
- Home arena: Delaware Field House

1997–98 America East Conference men's basketball standings
	Conf.				Overall
Team	W		L	PCT	W		L	PCT
Delaware †	12	–	6	.667	20	–	10	.667
Boston University	12	–	6	.667	19	–	11	.633
Vermont	11	–	7	.611	16	–	11	.593
Hartford	11	–	7	.611	15	–	12	.556
Hofstra	11	–	7	.611	19	–	12	.613
Drexel	10	–	8	.556	13	–	15	.464
Northeastern	9	–	9	.500	14	–	14	.500
New Hampshire	6	–	12	.333	10	–	17	.370
Towson	4	–	14	.222	8	–	20	.286
Maine	4	–	14	.222	7	–	20	.259
† 1998 America East tournament winner Rankings from AP poll

The 1997–98 Delaware Fightin' Blue Hens men's basketball team represented the University of Delaware during the 1997–98 NCAA Division I men's basketball season. The Fightin' Blue Hens, led by third-year head coach Mike Brey, played their home games at the Delaware Field House and were members of the America East Conference. They finished the season 20–10, 12–6 in AEC play to finish atop the conference regular season standings. They were champions of the AEC tournament to earn an automatic bid to the NCAA tournament where they lost in the opening round to No. 2 seed Purdue.

== Roster ==
1997–98 Delaware Fightin' Blue Hens men's basketball team
Players
Coaches

Pos.	#	Name	Height	Weight	Year	Hometown
G	3	Tyrone Perry	5 ft 11 in (1.8 m)	175 lb (79 kg)	Jr	Newport News, Virginia
F	5	Mike Pegues	6 ft 5 in (1.96 m)	230 lb (104 kg)	So	Washington, D.C.
F	22	Darryl Presley	6 ft 6 in (1.98 m)	215 lb (98 kg)	So
C		John Bennett	6 ft 10 in (2.08 m)	225 lb (102 kg)	Jr

Head coach

- Mike Brey (George Washington)

Assistant coach(es)

- Kenny Blakeney (Duke)

Legend

- (C) Team captain
- (S) Suspended
- (I) Ineligible
- (W) Walk-on
- Injured
- Current redshirt

== Schedule and results ==
Date time, TV	Rank^{#}	Opponent^{#}	Result	Record	Site (attendance) city, state
Regular season
Nov 15, 1997*		at George Washington	L 79–84		Charles E. Smith Athletic Center; Washington, D.C.
Nov 25, 1997*; 7:30 p.m.		Virginia	L 57–64		Bob Carpenter Center (4,353); Newark, Delaware
Dec 3, 1997		at Drexel	L 63–65		Daskalakis Athletic Center; Philadelphia, Pennsylvania
America East tournament
NCAA tournament
Mar 13, 1998*	(15 MW)	vs. (2 MW) No. 11 Purdue; First round	L 56–95	20–10	United Center; Chicago, Illinois
*Non-conference game. ^{#}Rankings from AP Poll. (#) Tournament seedings in parentheses. MW=Midwest. All times are in Eastern Time.
