= Bill Herrion =

American college basketball coach (born 1958)

Current position
- Title: Assistant coach
- Team: Stonehill
- Conference: NEC

Biographical details
- Born: April 6, 1958 (age 68)
- Education: Merrimack

Coaching career (HC unless noted)
- 1985–1990: Boston University (assistant)
- 1990–1991: George Washington (assistant)
- 1991–1999: Drexel
- 1999–2005: East Carolina
- 2005–2023: New Hampshire
- 2023–2024: Monomoy Regional HS (assistant)
- 2024–present: Stonehill (assistant)

Head coaching record
- Overall: 464–472 (.496)

Accomplishments and honors

Championships
- 3 America East tournament (1994–1996); 4 America East regular season (1993–1996)

Awards
- 4× America East Coach of the Year (1993, 1995, 1996, 1999)

William Richard Herrion (born April 6, 1958) is an American college basketball coach. From 2005 to 2023, he was the men's head coach at the University of New Hampshire. Prior to coming to UNH, he served as the head coach at East Carolina University and Drexel University. He has been an assistant with Boston University, George Washington University, and the U.S. National Team.

== Personal life ==
Herrion is a 1981 graduate of Merrimack College.

Herrion's son Ryan played for him at UNH from 2008 through 2012, and was director of operations and video coordinator for the Wildcats from 2013 to 2015.

Herrion's brother Tom formerly served in the NCAA's Division I as the head men's basketball coach at the College of Charleston and an assistant coach at the University of Pittsburgh. Tom is the former head men's basketball coach at Marshall University.

== Coaching career ==
Herrion began his college coaching career in 1985 as an assistant under Mike Jarvis at Boston University. He followed Jarvis to George Washington University before striking out on his own as a head coach. In April 1991, Herrion was hired to coach Drexel after Dayton assistant Tom McConnell turned down the job. Herrion later coached at East Carolina and UNH.

He is one of the most successful men's coaches in the history of the America East Conference. The Drexel Dragons won three conference championships in a row under Herrion's leadership from 1994 to 1996. In 1998, on the occasion of the conference's 20th anniversary, he was named one of the four most influential coaches in the conference's history: the other three coaches were Jarvis, Rick Pitino and Hall of Famer Jim Calhoun. He holds the conference record for most playoff wins (18 with Drexel, 1 with UNH, for a total of 19.)

On December 4, 2010, he won his 300th game when UNH beat Colgate, 65–60, and earned his 400th career win on January 10, 2018 in a 71–67 win over Binghamton.

On March 14, 2023, Herrion was fired after 18 seasons as the head coach of UNH.

== Head coaching record ==
Record table
Season	Team	Overall	Conference	Standing	Postseason
Drexel Dragons (North Atlantic Conference / America East Conference) (1991–1999)
1991–92	Drexel	16–14	9–5	2nd	
1992–93	Drexel	22–7	12–2	1st	
1993–94	Drexel	25–5	12–2	1st	NCAA Division I First Round
1994–95	Drexel	22–8	12–4	1st	NCAA Division I First Round
1995–96	Drexel	27–4	17–1	1st	NCAA Division I Second Round
1996–97	Drexel	22–9	16–2	2nd	NIT First Round
1997–98	Drexel	13–15	10–8	6th	
1998–99	Drexel	20–9	15–3	2nd	
Drexel:		167–71 (.702)	103–27 (.792)		
East Carolina Pirates (Colonial Athletic Association) (1999–2001)
1999–2000	East Carolina	10–18	5–11	8th	
2000–01	East Carolina	14–14	6–10	7th	
East Carolina Pirates (Conference USA) (2001–2005)
2001–02	East Carolina	12–18	5–11	11th	
2002–03	East Carolina	12–15	3–13	13th	
2003–04	East Carolina	13–14	5–11	11th	
2004–05	East Carolina	9–19	4–12	13th	
East Carolina:		70–98 (.417)	28–68 (.292)		
New Hampshire Wildcats (America East Conference) (2005–2023)
2005–06	New Hampshire	12–17	8–8	5th	
2006–07	New Hampshire	10–20	6–10	T-6th	
2007–08	New Hampshire	9–20	6–10	7th	
2008–09	New Hampshire	14–16	8–8	5th	
2009–10	New Hampshire	13–17	6–10	6th	
2010–11	New Hampshire	12–18	6–10	7th	
2011–12	New Hampshire	13–16	7–9	5th	
2012–13	New Hampshire	9–20	5–11	7th	
2013–14	New Hampshire	6–24	4–12	9th	
2014–15	New Hampshire	19–13	11–5	4th	CIT First Round
2015–16	New Hampshire	20–13	11–5	T–3rd	CIT Second Round
2016–17	New Hampshire	20–12	10–6	T–3rd	
2017–18	New Hampshire	10–21	6–10	T–6th	
2018–19	New Hampshire	5–24	3–13	9th	
2019–20	New Hampshire	15–15	8–8	T–4th	
2020–21	New Hampshire	10–9	9–6	3rd	
2021–22	New Hampshire	15–13	10–8	T–3rd	
2022–23	New Hampshire	15–15	9–7	3rd	
New Hampshire:		227–303 (.428)	133–163 (.449)		
Total:		464–472 (.496)			
National champion Postseason invitational champion Conference regular season champion Conference regular season and conference tournament champion Division regular season champion Division regular season and conference tournament champion Conference tournament champion
