= Taurence Chisholm =

American former basketball player

Personal information
- Born: 1960s
- Listed height: 5 ft 6 in (1.68 m)

Career information
- High school: McDonogh School (Owings Mills, Maryland); Paul Laurence Dunbar (Baltimore, Maryland)
- College: Delaware (1984–1988)
- NBA draft: 1988: undrafted
- Position: Point guard

Career highlights
- UPI Little All-America (1988); Second-team All-ECC (1988); ECC All-Rookie Team (1985)

Taurence Duvael Chisholm (born in the 1960s) is an American former basketball player who is known for his collegiate career at the University of Delaware between 1984–85 and 1987–88. A point guard, Chisholm ended his career with 877 assists, which was the fourth-highest total in NCAA Division I history at the time of his graduation (as of 2014, he is 20th all-time). In 1985–86 he finished second in the nation in assists per game (apg), and his 8.0 apg average for his entire career ranks fifth all-time in Division I history.

Chisholm is 5 ft 6 in (1.68 m) and hails from Maryland. The first portion of his high school career was spent at McDonogh School in Owings Mills, Maryland before he transferred to Paul Laurence Dunbar High School in Baltimore. He accepted a scholarship to play for the Delaware Fightin' Blue Hens in Newark, Delaware. As a freshman in 1984–85 he was named to the East Coast Conference (ECC) All Rookie Team. After compiling 200+ assists in each of his four seasons at Delaware (no other player in program history recorded 200+ in any single season), Chisholm was named a finalist for the Frances Pomeroy Naismith Award as a senior, which is given annually to the country's best male player who is 6-feet tall or shorter. That season he was also named a second team all-conference selection, and United Press International named him to their Little All-America team.

He had a brief stint in the now-defunct United States Basketball League for the Philadelphia Aces.

== See also ==
- List of NCAA Division I men's basketball career assists leaders
