= NBA G League Basketball Executive of the Year Award =

The NBA G League Basketball Executive of the Year is an NBA G League award given for the first time in 2015–16 to the top front office executive involved in basketball operations. The award is determined by peer voting. Sioux Falls Skyforce general manager Adam Simon was the inaugural winner.

== Winners ==
Season	Winner	Team
2015–16	Adam Simon	Sioux Falls Skyforce
2016–17	Mike Gansey	Canton Charge
2017–18	Malik Rose	Erie BayHawks
2018–19	Trajan Langdon	Long Island Nets
2019–20	Bart Taylor	Salt Lake City Stars
2020–21	Chad Sanders	Raptors 905
2021–22	Travis Stockbridge	Rio Grande Valley Vipers
2023–24	Eric Amsler	Sioux Falls Skyforce
2024–25	Ryan Borges	Westchester Knicks
2025–26	Liron Fanan	Cleveland Charge
