= Spencer Dunkley =

British basketball player and coach (born 1969)

Personal information
- Born: 5 September 1969 (age 57) Wolverhampton, England
- Listed height: 6 ft 11 in (2.11 m)
- Listed weight: 230 lb (104 kg)

Career information
- High school: Newark (Newark, Delaware)
- College: Delaware (1989–1993)
- NBA draft: 1993: 2nd round, 51st overall pick
- Drafted by: Indiana Pacers
- Playing career: 1993–2004
- Position: Center

Career history

Playing
- 1993: Long Island Surf
- 1993–1994: Maccabi Tel Aviv
- 1994–1995: Avtodor Saratov
- 1995–1996: Optima Gent
- 1996: Connecticut Pride
- 1996: Limoges CSP
- 1996–1998: Besançon BCD
- 1998–1999: Scandone Avellino
- 1999: CB Valladolid
- 2000–2001: Lugano Tigers
- 2001: Scandone Avellino
- 2001–2002: Viola Reggio Calabria
- 2002: Aveiro Esgueira
- 2002–2003: Maccabi Haifa B.C.
- 2003–2004: London Towers

Coaching
- 2009–2012: Appoquinimink HS

Career highlights
- First-team All-NEC (1993)
- Stats at Basketball Reference

Earl Spencer Dunkley (born 5 September 1969) is a British former basketball player.

== Biography ==
Earl Spencer Dunkley was born in Wolverhampton on 5 September 1969. He attended Parkfield High School in Wolverhampton before moving to the U.S. and settling in Newark, Delaware, where he studied at Newark High School and the University of Delaware, playing on the latter's basketball team.

Dunkley was selected by the Indiana Pacers of the NBA during the 1993 draft, becoming the first British basketballer to play in the NBA. As a journeyman who played as a centre, he went on to play for teams in Belgium, England, France, Israel, Italy, Russia, Spain, Switzerland, and the U.S. before his retirement in 2004. He then returned to Delaware, where he coached the Appoquinimink High School basketball team from 2009 to 2012.
