= Delaware Field House =

Athletics facility in Newark, Delaware

Coordinates: 39.662799°N 75.750965°W

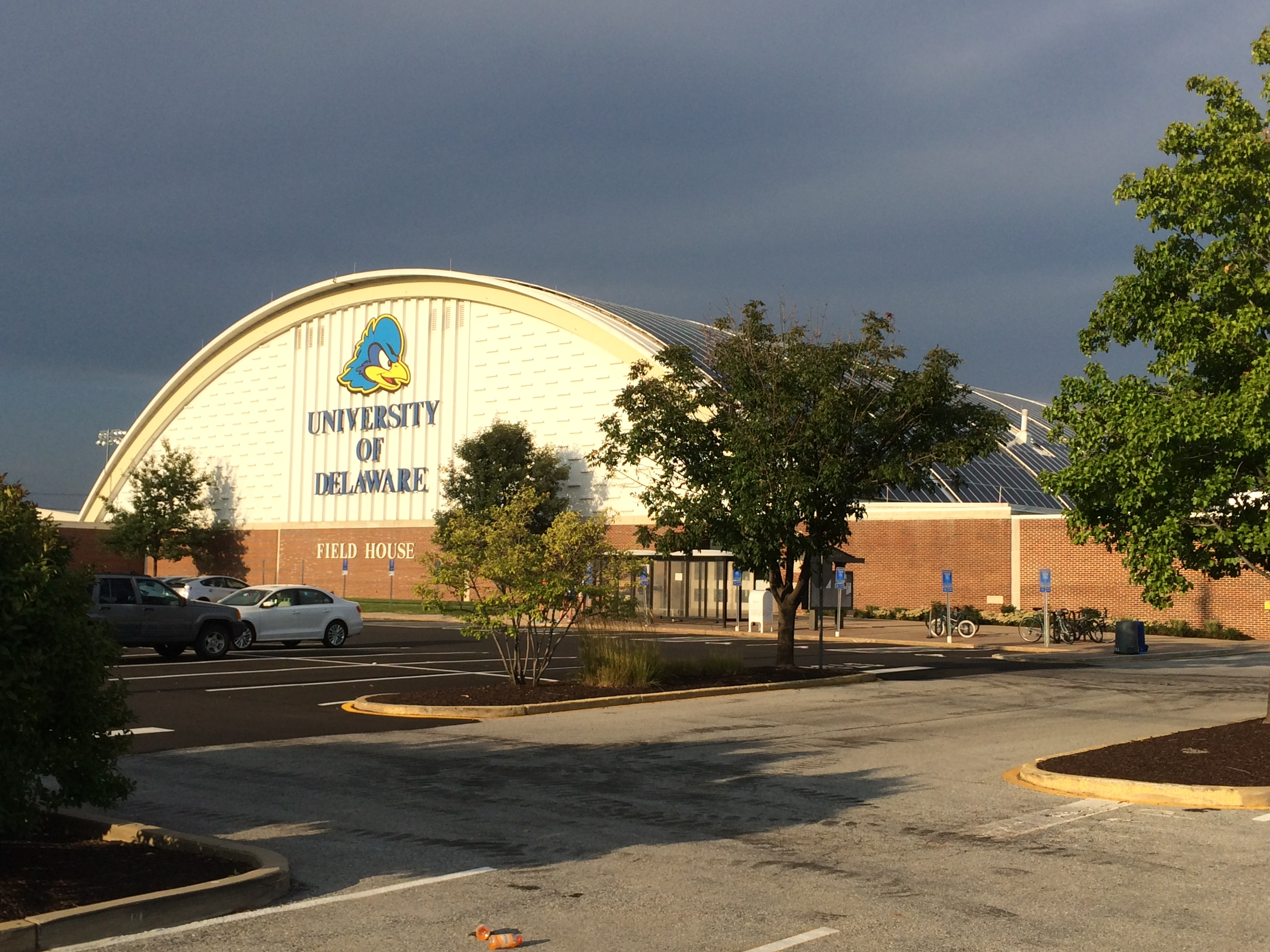
- Interactive map of Delaware Field House
- Location: South College Avenue; Newark, DE 19716
- Owner: University of Delaware
- Operator: University of Delaware Athletics Department
- Surface: Artificial turf

Construction
- Opened: 1966
- Renovated: 2013

The Delaware Field House is an indoor athletics facility on the campus of the University of Delaware in Newark, Delaware. Constructed in 1966, the venue seated 4,000 fans for indoor track and tennis events. It served as the site of intercollegiate basketball games as well until the completion of the Bob Carpenter Center in mid-1992.

The Field House is part of a complex which includes the new arena, Delaware Stadium (football), Rullo Stadium (field hockey/lacrosse), Bob Hannah Stadium (baseball), an outdoor swimming pool, and six tennis courts.

The arena served as the site of the America East Conference (then North Atlantic Conference) men's basketball tournament championship game in 1992.

In 2010, the University installed solar panels on the half barrel roof of the Field House. In 2013, the Field House was converted into an indoor practice facility with artificial turf for all sports including football.
