= Malik Rose =

American basketball player (born 1974)

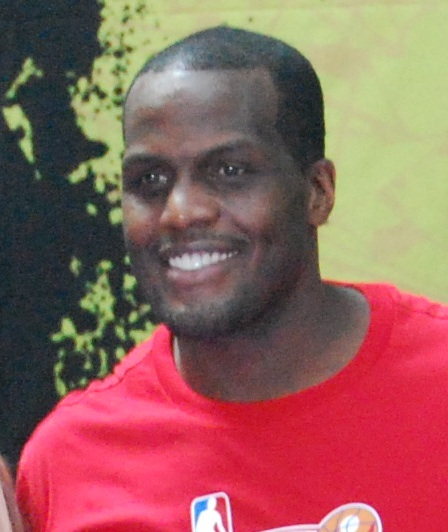
- Rose in 2008

Personal information
- Born: November 23, 1974 (age 51) Philadelphia, Pennsylvania, U.S.
- Listed height: 6 ft 7 in (2.01 m)
- Listed weight: 255 lb (116 kg)

Career information
- High school: Overbrook (Philadelphia, Pennsylvania)
- College: Drexel (1992–1996)
- NBA draft: 1996: 2nd round, 44th overall pick
- Drafted by: Charlotte Hornets
- Playing career: 1996–2009
- Position: Power forward / center
- Number: 31, 13, 9

Career history
- 1996–1997: Charlotte Hornets
- 1997–2005: San Antonio Spurs
- 2005–2009: New York Knicks
- 2009: Oklahoma City Thunder

Career highlights
- As player: 2× NBA champion (1999, 2003); Third-team All-American – UPI (1996); 2× America East Player of the Year (1995, 1996); 3× North Atlantic tournament MVP (1994–1996); No. 00 retired by Drexel Dragons; As executive: NBA G League Executive of the Year (2018)

Career statistics
- Points: 5,003 (6.2 ppg)
- Rebounds: 3,371 (4.1 rpg)
- Assists: 684 (0.8 apg)
- Stats at NBA.com
- Stats at Basketball Reference

Malik Jabari Rose (born November 23, 1974) is an American former professional basketball player, executive, and analyst. Rose played 13 seasons in the National Basketball Association (NBA), winning championships with the San Antonio Spurs in 1999 and 2003.

== Early life and education ==
Rose was born on November 23, 1974, in Philadelphia. He attended and graduated from Overbrook High School in Philadelphia, the same high school as Wilt Chamberlain. He graduated from Drexel University with All-American honors after leading the Dragons to their lone NCAA Tournament victory with an upset of the University of Memphis 75–63. At Drexel, Malik averaged over 16 points and 12 rebounds per game throughout his four-year college career. He was a student teacher at Robert E. Lamberton School and Albert M. Greenfield Elementary. In 2011, the 1995-96 men's basketball team, led by Rose, was inducted into the Drexel Athletic Hall of Fame.

== NBA career ==
Rose was drafted in 1996 in the second round by the Charlotte Hornets. Rose is the second Drexel basketball player to participate in the NBA, following Michael Anderson. He was signed as a free agent by the San Antonio Spurs in 1997, and quickly became one of their more popular players due to his displays of hustle, defense, and skill despite being undersized. Rose was on the Spurs' NBA championship teams in 1999 and 2003. On February 24, 2005, Rose was traded along with a pair of first-round draft picks to the New York Knicks for Nazr Mohammed and Jamison Brewer, much to the dismay of Spurs fans. A highlight during his tenure with the Knicks was a 10-point, 15-rebound and 9-assist performance in a 94–93 win over the Charlotte Bobcats on April 18, 2007, just missing a triple-double. After being relegated to a minor supporting role for the Knicks for four years, Rose was traded from the Knicks to the Oklahoma City Thunder on February 19, 2009, for Chris Wilcox.

One of Rose's most memorable games occurred during the opening round of the 2002 Playoffs against the Seattle SuperSonics. With star front court players Tim Duncan and David Robinson out, Rose stepped in as a starter. Bringing the Spurs back from a 26-point half-time deficit, the Spurs eventually lost by 12 but not before making a contest of the game. Malik had 28 points and 13 rebounds for the game.

== Post-NBA career ==
The Oklahoma City Thunder renounced the rights to Rose on December 22, 2009.

Rose joined the Madison Square Garden Network as a pregame analyst for his former Knicks team for the 2009–2010 season. He was also named the color analyst for the NBA Development League team, the Austin Toros, who broadcast their games on television for the first time.

On December 20, 2011, Rose was hired as color commentator for the Philadelphia 76ers television broadcasts. Rose served in this role from 2011 to 2015. On November 15, 2014, Rose made his first appearance for NBA TV. Rose made appearances on NBATV during the 2014–15 season on days when it did not conflict with his 76ers schedule.

On August 12, 2015, Rose was hired as manager of basketball operations for the Atlanta Hawks. On April 11, 2017, Rose was promoted to the general manager of the Erie BayHawks, the Hawks' affiliate in the NBA G League. He was named the G League's Basketball Executive of the Year in his only season with the organization.

In 2018, Rose was hired as an assistant general manager within the Detroit Pistons' organization and left the BayHawks.

In the summer of 2020, Rose stepped down from the Pistons front office to take on a job with the NBA front office as vice president of basketball operations. Rose would be named Head of Basketball Operations for the NBA G-League on January 5, 2022.

Outside of basketball, Rose has been involved in the San Antonio community with his charity work and the San Antonio staple 'Malik's Philly's Phamous' restaurant, specializing in Philadelphia's beloved cheesesteak sandwiches & specialty fries.

== NBA career statistics ==
Legend
GP	Games played	GS	Games started	MPG	Minutes per game
FG%	Field goal percentage	3P%	3-point field goal percentage	FT%	Free throw percentage
RPG	Rebounds per game	APG	Assists per game	SPG	Steals per game
BPG	Blocks per game	PPG	Points per game	**Bold**	Career high
†	Won an NBA championship

=== Regular season ===
Year	Team	GP	GS	MPG	FG%	3P%	FT%	RPG	APG	SPG	BPG	PPG
1996–97	Charlotte	54	1	9.7	**.477**	.000	.613	3.0	.6	.5	.3	3.0
1997–98	San Antonio	53	0	8.1	.434	.333	.639	1.7	.4	.4	.1	3.0
1998–99†	San Antonio	47	0	12.9	.463	.000	.671	3.9	.6	.9	.5	6.0
1999–00	San Antonio	74	3	18.1	.457	.333	.722	4.5	.6	.5	**.7**	6.7
2000–01	San Antonio	57	9	21.4	.435	.176	.713	5.4	.8	**1.0**	**.7**	7.7
2001–02	San Antonio	**82**	1	21.0	.463	.083	.720	6.0	.7	.9	.5	9.4
2002–03†	San Antonio	79	13	**24.5**	.459	.400	.791	**6.4**	**1.6**	.7	.5	**10.4**
2003–04	San Antonio	67	13	18.7	.428	.000	**.813**	4.8	1.0	.5	.4	7.9
2004–05	San Antonio	50	1	17.2	.464	.000	.697	4.5	.8	.6	.2	6.3
2004–05	New York	26	4	23.6	.425	.167	.782	4.4	.7	.6	.3	8.3
2005–06	New York	72	**35**	15.5	.374	**1.000**	.781	3.6	.9	.6	.2	4.4
2006–07	New York	65	2	12.5	.398	.250	.808	2.7	1.0	.4	.1	3.0
2007–08	New York	49	3	10.1	.367	.286	.725	2.1	.6	.3	.1	3.5
2008–09	New York	18	0	8.9	.268	.000	.727	1.7	.6	.1	.1	1.7
2008–09	Oklahoma City	20	0	15.7	.378	.000	.800	3.3	1.3	.5	.1	5.0
Career		813	85	16.5	.437	.177	.743	4.1	.8	.6	.4	6.2

=== Playoffs ===
Year	Team	GP	GS	MPG	FG%	3P%	FT%	RPG	APG	SPG	BPG	PPG
1997	Charlotte	2	0	6.0	.500	.000	.000	2.5	.5	.0	.0	2.0
1998	San Antonio	5	0	3.6	**.667**	.000	.500	1.4	.2	.2	.0	2.0
1999†	San Antonio	17	0	11.4	.368	.000	.692	2.3	.2	.4	.2	2.7
2000	San Antonio	4	0	20.8	.444	.000	.556	4.8	.3	.5	**.8**	5.3
2001	San Antonio	13	0	16.5	.418	**.333**	**.850**	3.8	.3	.2	.1	4.9
2002	San Antonio	10	**3**	**29.2**	.479	.000	.740	**7.9**	**1.4**	**1.0**	.5	**12.9**
2003†	San Antonio	**24**	0	23.3	.419	.000	.766	5.8	1.0	.7	.5	9.3
2004	San Antonio	7	0	8.3	.250	.000	.500	2.4	.9	.6	.3	1.4
Career		82	3	17.5	.427	.111	.739	4.3	.7	.5	.3	6.2

== See also ==
- Drexel Dragons
- List of NCAA Division I men's basketball players with 2000 points and 1000 rebounds
- List of NCAA Division I men's basketball career rebounding leaders
