= Philadelphia Big 5 =

College basketball rivalry between six U.S. schools

- Sport: College basketball
- Founded: 1955 (men); 1979 (women)
- No. of teams: 6
- Country: United States
- Headquarters: Philadelphia, Pennsylvania, U.S.
- Most recent champions: Men: Villanova; Women: Villanova
- Most titles: Men: Villanova (30); Women: Villanova (22)
- Related competitions: The American, A-10, Big East, City 6, CAA and Ivy League basketball
- Website: www.philadelphiabig5.org

Locations in the Greater Philadelphia Area

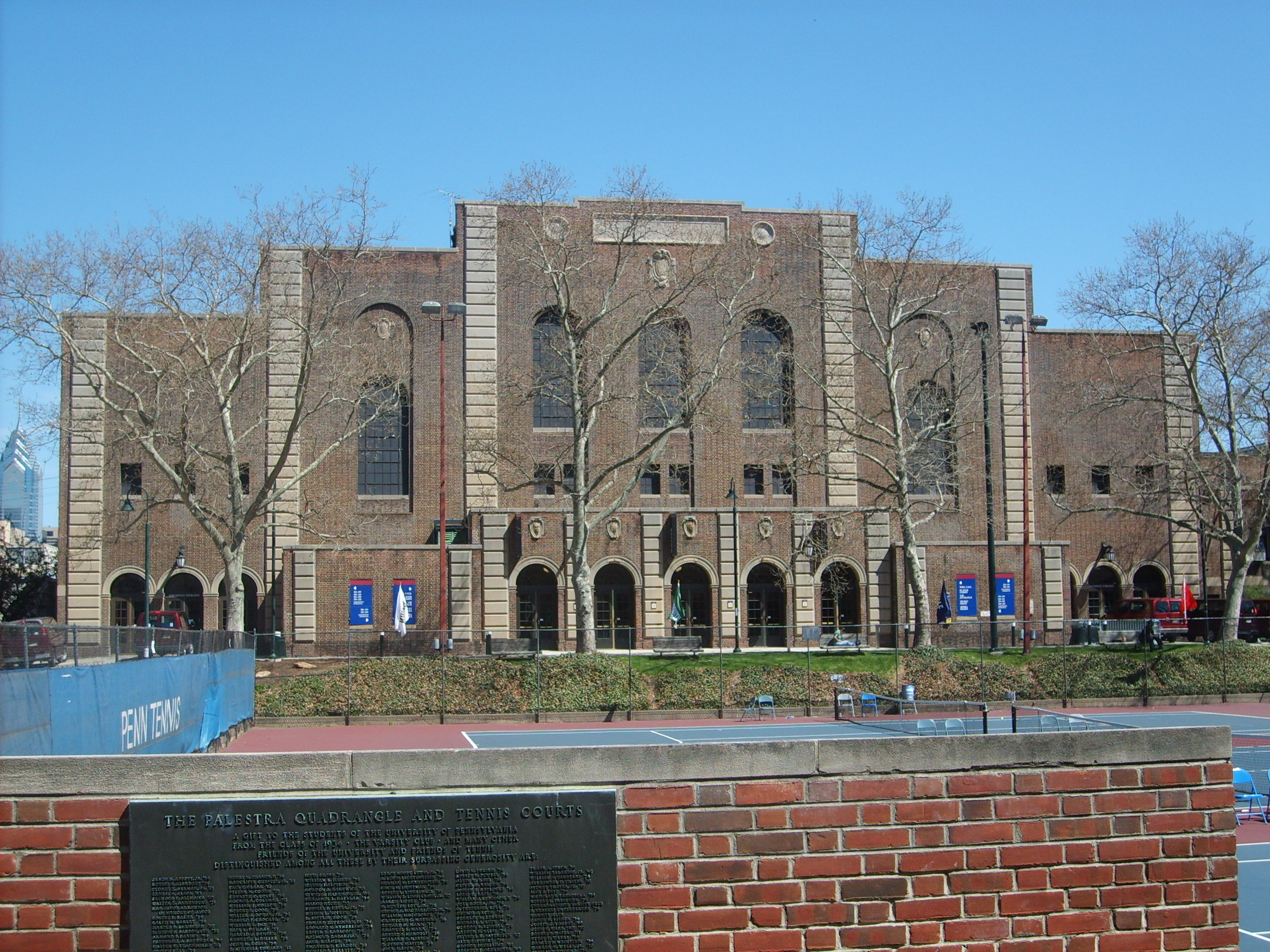
The Palestra, Penn's home court and the long-time home of Big 5 basketball games

The Philadelphia Big 5, known simply as the Big 5, is an association of six college athletic programs in Philadelphia, Pennsylvania. It is not a conference, but rather a group of NCAA Division I basketball schools who compete for the city’s collegiate championship.

The Big 5 originally consisted of La Salle, Penn, Saint Joseph's, Temple, and Villanova; with the start of the 2023–24 season, the Big 5 expanded to include Drexel. Drexel, La Salle, Penn, Saint Joseph's, and Temple are located in the city of Philadelphia, while Villanova is located in a nearby Main Line suburb of the same name. Three of the six schools (La Salle, Saint Joseph's and Villanova) are affiliated with the Roman Catholic Church, while Temple is the only public university in the group.

From its founding in 1955 until 2023, the five men's teams played each other once annually in a round-robin format to determine the Big 5 champion. (Note: For teams that played each other twice due to being in the same conference, the second matchup between the schools was counted for Big 5 competition.) After the addition of Drexel, the format was changed, and the six teams were split into two pods, with all of the teams participating in a same-day, triple-header showcase event on the first Saturday in December known as the Big 5 Classic. The winner of the first-place game during the showcase, which features the winners of each pod, determines the Big 5 champion for the season.

The women's teams competed in the same round-robin format from 1979 until 2024, when the women's counterpart of the Big 5 Classic was created. Following the same scheduling structure as the men's, the women's Big 5 Classic is played on the first Sunday in December, one day after the men's showcase.

Big 5 schools represent some of the oldest and most successful men's basketball programs in the nation. Three of the six teams—Temple (6th), Villanova (19th), and Penn (24th)—are in the top-50 for all-time NCAA Division I victories. From 1977 to 2022, at least one team from the Big 5 appeared in the men's NCAA tournament.

Both Villanova's men's and women's basketball teams hold the most Big 5 titles, with 30 and 22 titles, respectively.

Each year the Herb Good Basketball Club selects All-Big 5 teams, as well as a coach of the year. The most outstanding player in Big 5 competition receives the Robert V. Geasey Trophy.

The Big 5 creed reads: "They say there's no trophy for winning the Big Five. They must not be from Philadelphia."

== History ==
=== Original round-robin format (1955–2023) ===
The Big 5's previous logo before the addition of Drexel in 2023

Jerry Ford, the then-athletic director at the University of Pennsylvania, is credited with originally conceiving the idea of a competition between the five men's college basketball programs in the city of Philadelphia. With agreement between the four other athletic directors, the Big 5 was officially announced on November 23, 1954. Beginning with the 1955–56 season, a "round-robin city series" would take place at the Palestra (the home arena of the Penn Quakers), which had just been renovated and expanded. Games were typically scheduled as double or triple-headers, and all schools agreed to split ticket and concessions revenues equally once Penn was paid for upkeep costs on The Palestra. The arrangement promoted already intense intra-city collegiate basketball rivalries dating back three decades or more, the most notable of which including the Holy War between Saint Joseph's and Villanova.

Using the round-robin format, each team played the four other teams once, and the team(s) with the best record in was then crowned as the Big 5 champion. For teams that played each other twice due to being in the same conference, the second matchup between the schools was counted for Big 5 competition. No tiebreakers were in place, and as a result, leading teams with identical records were declared shared champions of the Big 5. In 1980–81, all five teams finished with a 2–2 record, resulting in a five-way split for the title.

In 1979, a women's version of the competition began play, following the same round-robin format as the men's.

During the heyday of the Big 5, many major college programs, especially in the northeastern United States, were independents. However, in the 1980s, as the Big East and Atlantic 10 conferences expanded to cover most of the Northeast (Villanova joined the Big East, while Temple, Saint Joseph's, and La Salle joined the Atlantic 10; Penn is a member of the Ivy League), and as college basketball became increasingly driven by television and its need to appeal to a broad national audience, the local character of the Big 5 became a liability. Starting with the 1986–87 season, Temple and Villanova began to move their home Big 5 games from the Palestra to their home arenas, and eventually, Temple head coach John Chaney and Villanova head coach Rollie Massimino sought to abandon the round-robin format to schedule more premier non-conference opponents. The full, four-game round-robin men's series ended after the 1990–91 season.

From 1991–92 to 1998–99, teams only played two other opponents in Big 5 play as opposed to the normal four. The full round-robin series was restored for the 1999–2000 season, however, the revival resulted in some changes, as the schools would no longer evenly split the proceeds from the games, and all games now took place at the home team's arena.

The rivalry between Saint Joseph's and Temple saw increased tension in the 2000s after an incident known as "Goon Gate". In a 2005 matchup between the two schools, Temple head coach John Chaney, who was frustrated with the officiating in the game, ordered his players to intentionally foul Saint Joseph's forward John Bryant, a move that Chaney described as sending in "the goons". Bryant fractured his arm as a result of the fouling, drawing anger from many Saint Joseph's fans, and Chaney's actions were seen as highly unsportsmanlike. Chaney would serve a suspension for the remainder of the season as a result of the incident.

Following Villanova's national championships in 2016 and 2018, a debate has emerged among Philadelphia sports fans about whether Villanova should be classified as a "Philly school", along with whether their national championships should be considered part of Philadelphia sports. Fans of other Big 5 schools contend that Villanova does not qualify because its campus is outside Philadelphia's city limits. In contrast, Villanova fans argue that because the team plays select home games at Xfinity Mobile Arena, and that their championship parades in both 2016 and 2018 were held in Center City, Philadelphia, the school has a clear connection to the city.

=== Addition of Drexel and Big 5 Classic (2023–2026) ===
Throughout the Big 5's existence, some had suggested adding Drexel. Drexel had already been a member of the City 6, which is an intra-city intramural competition among the six schools. These talks amplified during the 2006–07 season when Drexel beat three of the four Big 5 teams it played. However, no changes were made.

In December 2022, The Athletic reported that administrators at the Big 5 schools and Drexel were discussing "trying to find a way to resuscitate the Big 5." The meetings came after a sparsely attended Big 5 doubleheader at the Palestra. According to The Athletic, talks about reforms to the Big 5 began prior to the doubleheader as school administrators felt there was a decline in the series due to Villanova's recent dominance and many of the top local recruits opting not to play college basketball in Philadelphia.

In January 2023, the Big 5 announced a new format for the men's competition, which would include the addition of Drexel as a member of the series. In the new format, the six teams are split into two three-team pods, who play each other in November. On the first Saturday in December, the "Big 5 Classic", a triple-header showcase event, is held with a fifth place, third place, and championship game all taking place at the Wells Fargo Center (now Xfinity Mobile Arena). Some criticized the move as it eliminated the full round-robin nature of the Big 5, and many had wanted the Big 5 Classic to take place at the Palestra, where all Big 5 games used to take place.

In June 2024, the athletic directors of the Big 5 member schools introduced the women's Big 5 Classic, along with the addition of Drexel for the women's competition. Like the men's showcase, the six teams are split into the same two pods, and a same-day, triple-header event is held on the day before the men's edition of the showcase, the first Friday in December. However, unlike the men's showcase, the women's event is held at the Finneran Pavilion, located on the campus of Villanova University. In 2025, the women's Big 5 Classic was moved to the first Sunday in December, one day after the men's edition.

=== Return to round-robin format (2027) ===
On October 22, 2026, it was announced that five of the six schools (all except Villanova) had agreed to return to the traditional round-robin scheduling format for men's basketball beginning with the 2027–28 season. With the contract for the men's Big 5 Classic expiring, it will not continue for 2027, but there is a possibility it could be brought back at a later time. All six women's basketball programs are expected to continue with the current Big 5 Classic format.

== Current members ==
Institution	Location (in Pennsylvania)	Founded	Joined	Type	Enrollment	Endowment (millions)	Nickname	Colors	Primary conference
Pod 1
La Salle University	Philadelphia (Germantown)	1863	1955	Private	5,191	$80	Explorers		A-10
Temple University	Philadelphia (Cecil B. Moore) (Note: The neighborhood of Cecil B. Moore is also referred to as "Templetown", though this name is not officially endorsed by the university.)	1884	1955	Public (Note: As a member of the Commonwealth System of Higher Education, Temple is privately governed but receives financial support from the Pennsylvania state government.)	37,365	$872	Owls		American
Villanova University	Villanova	1842	1955	Private	9,800	$1,120	Wildcats		Big East
Pod 2
Drexel University	Philadelphia (University City)	1891	2023	Private	24,205	$1,000	Dragons		CAA
University of Pennsylvania	Philadelphia (University City)	1740	1955	Private	22,432	$20,000	Quakers		Ivy League
Saint Joseph's University	Philadelphia (Overbrook)/Lower Merion Township (Note: The core of the Saint Joseph's campus is within the boundaries of Overbrook, although the Philadelphia planning commission considers the campus to be separate from any city neighborhood. The campus crosses the city limits into Lower Merion Township.)	1851	1955	Private	6,779	$378	Hawks		A-10

=== Men's basketball program achievements ===
Program	All-time wins (Note: Through 2024–25 season)	National championships	Final Four appearances	NCAA tournament appearances	NIT championships
Temple	2,015	1 (1938)	2 (1956, 1958)	33	2 (1938, 1969)
Villanova	1,913	3 (1985, 2016, 2018)	7 (1939, 1971, 1985, 2009, 2016, 2018, 2022)	42	1 (1994)
Penn	1,854	2 (1920, 1921)	1 (1979)	25	0
Saint Joseph's	1,731	0	1 (1961)	21	0
La Salle	1,456	1 (1954)	2 (1954, 1955)	12	1 (1952)
Drexel	876	0	0	5	0

== Annual winners ==
=== Men ===
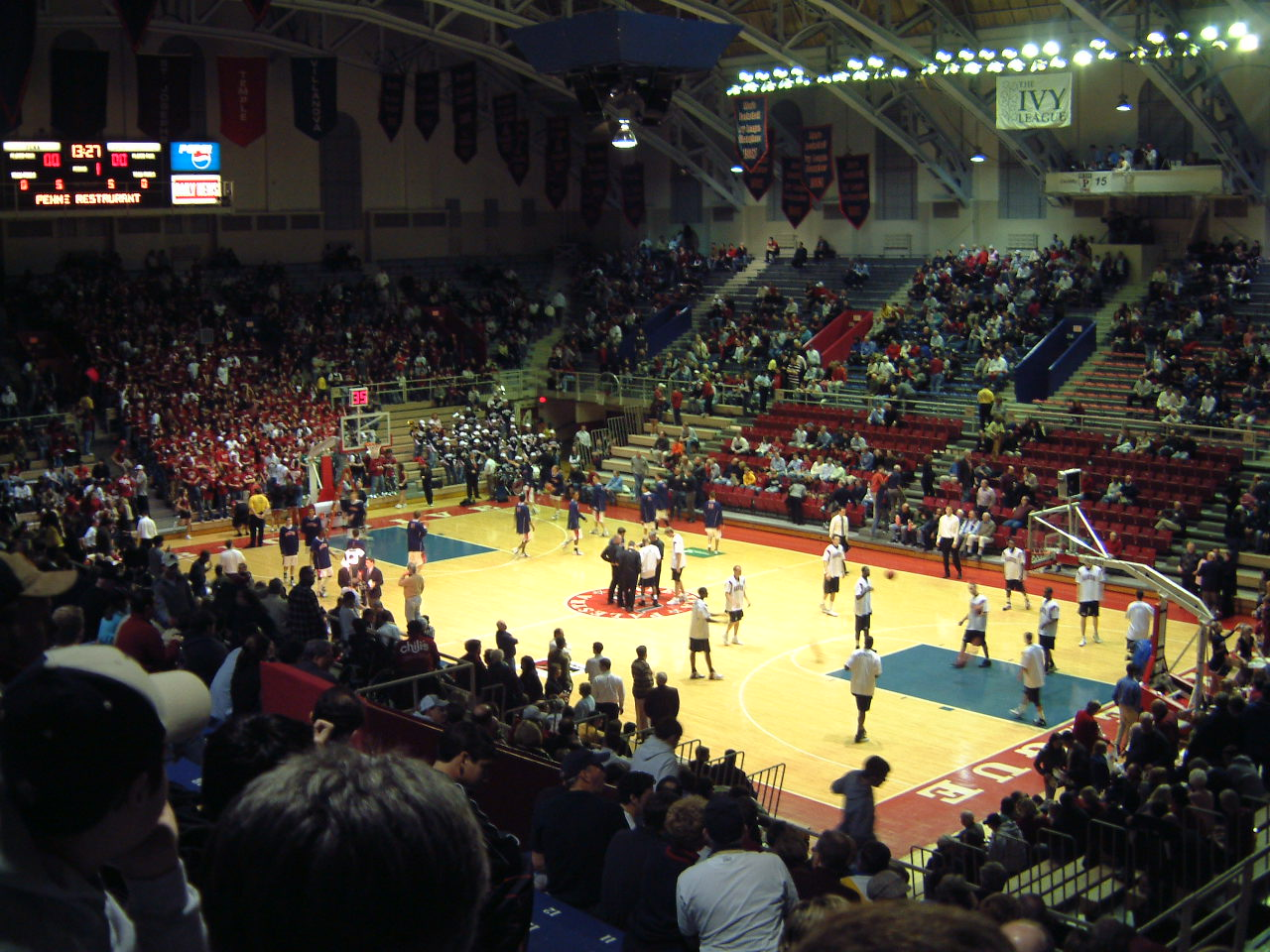
The Palestra on the campus of the University of Pennsylvania ("Penn")

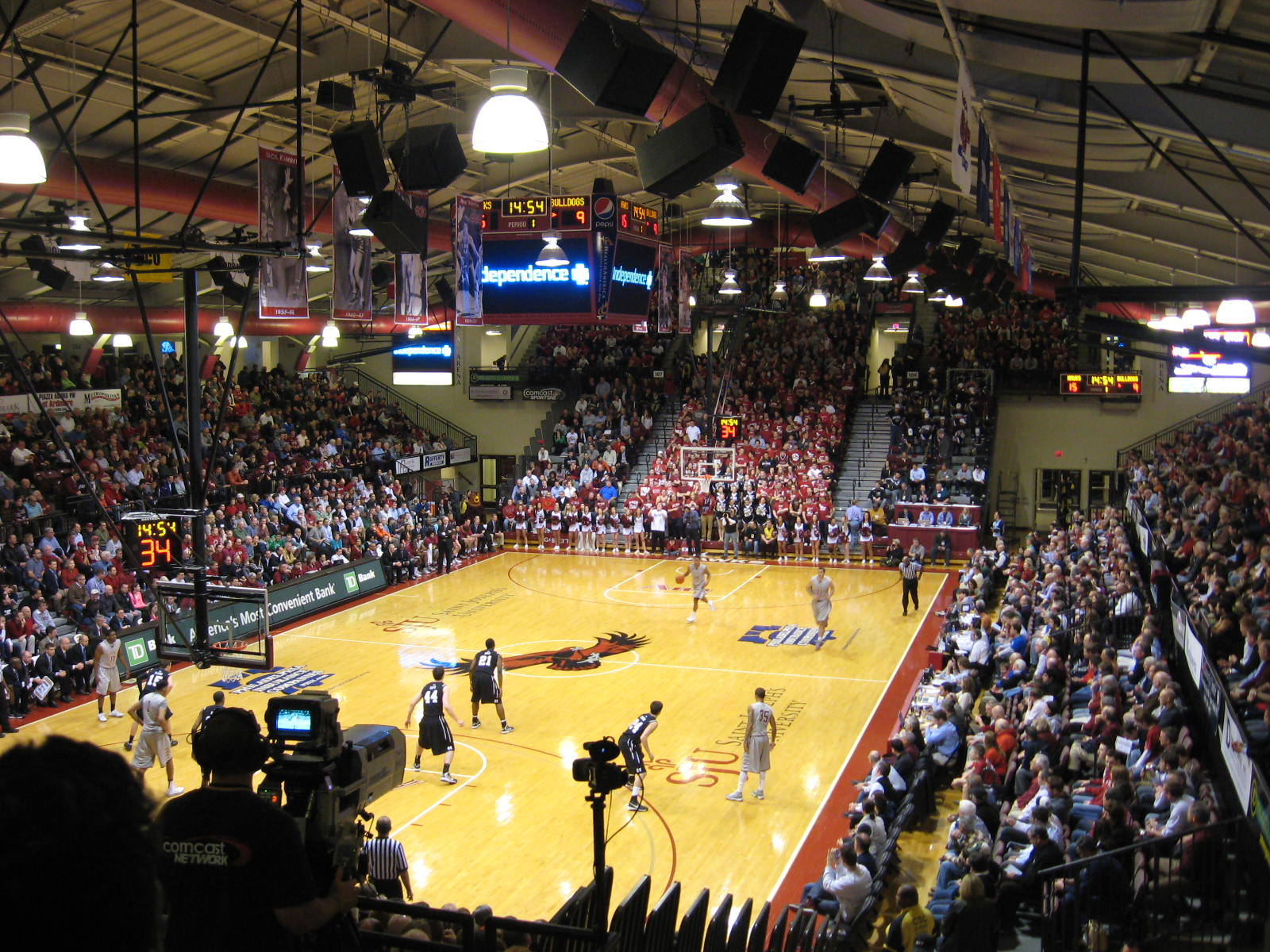
Hagan Arena on the campus of Saint Joseph's University

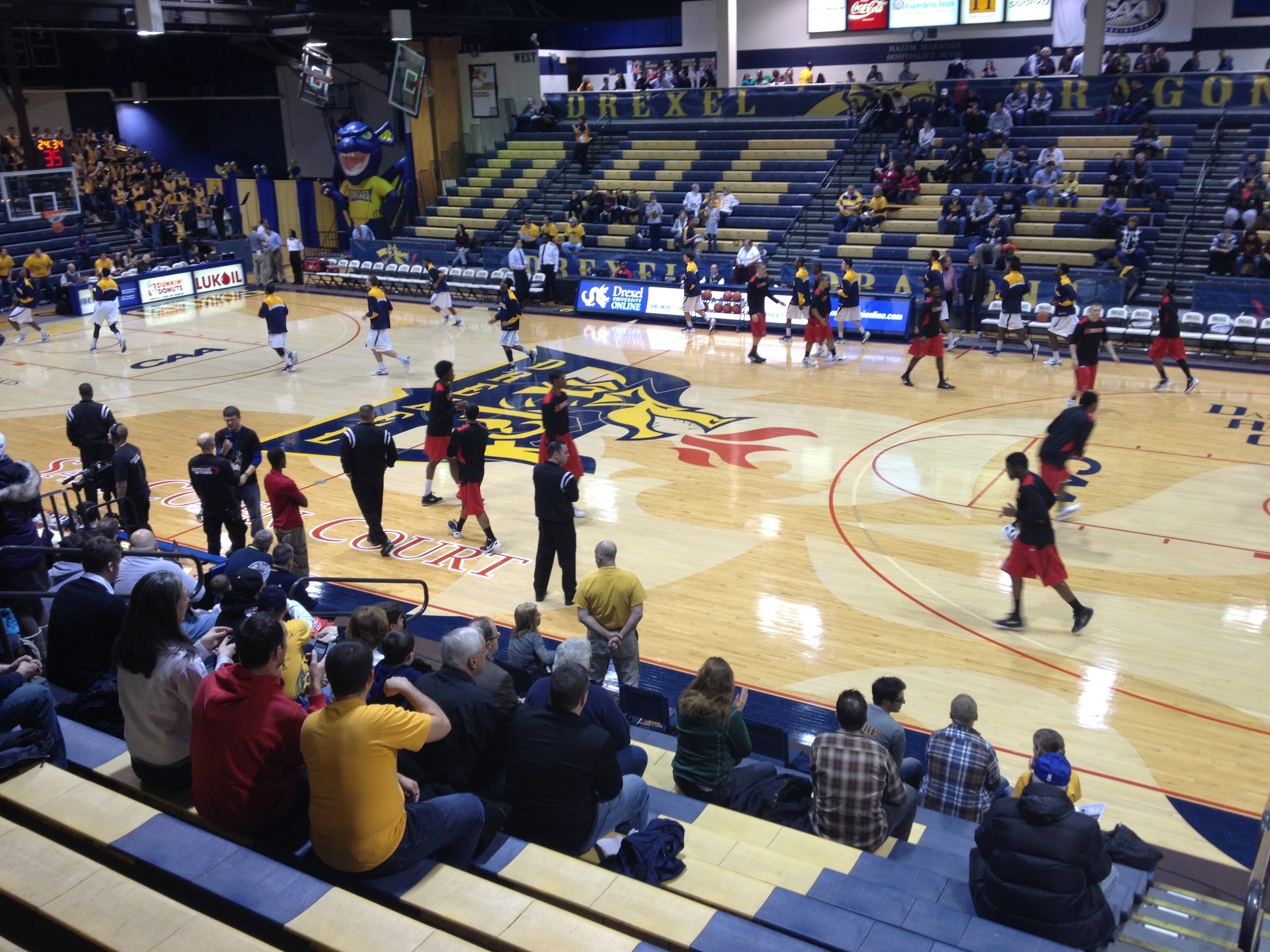
The Daskalakis Athletic Center on the campus of Drexel University

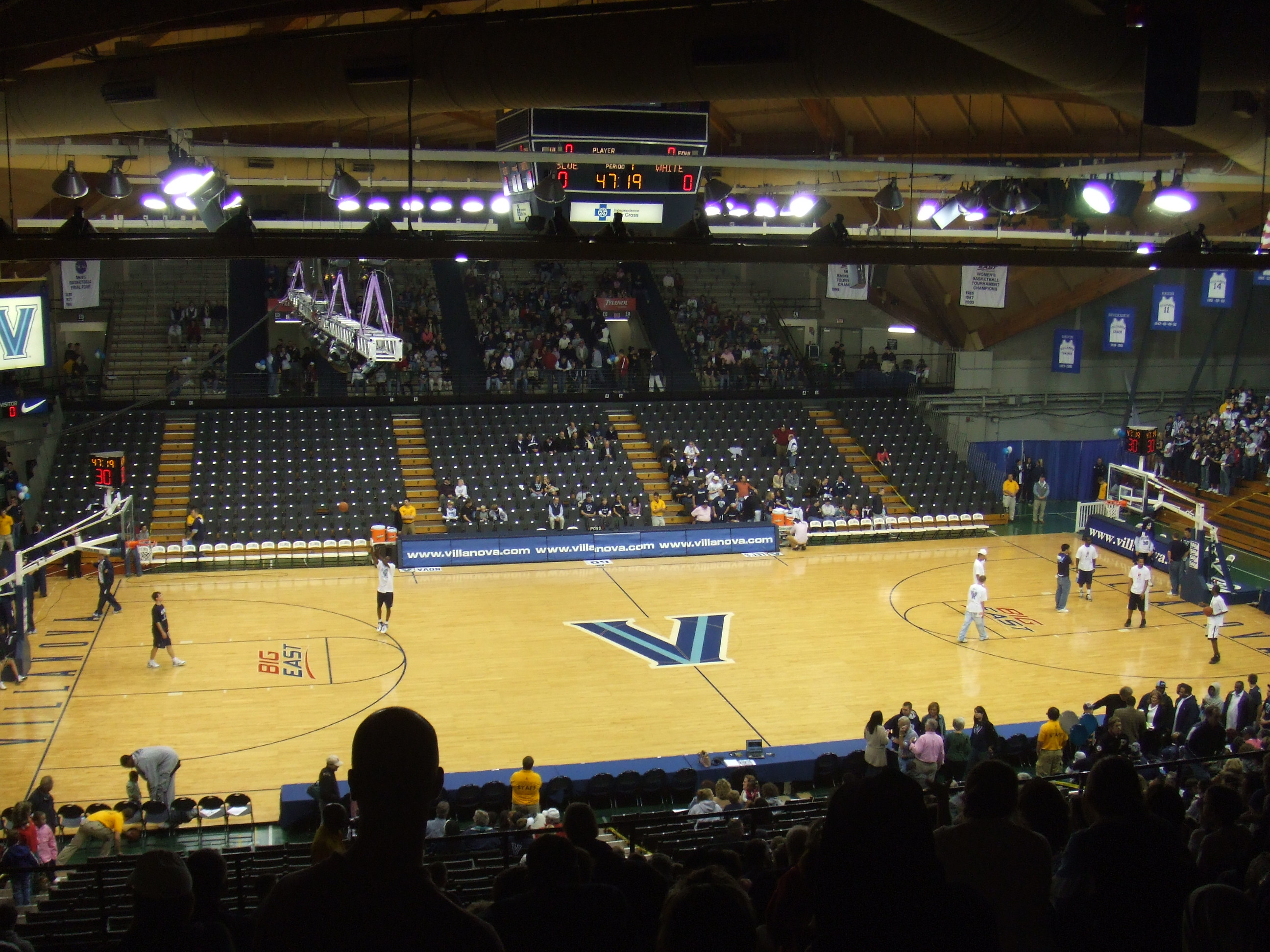
Finneran Pavilion on the campus of Villanova University

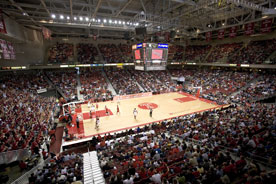
The Liacouras Center on the campus of Temple University

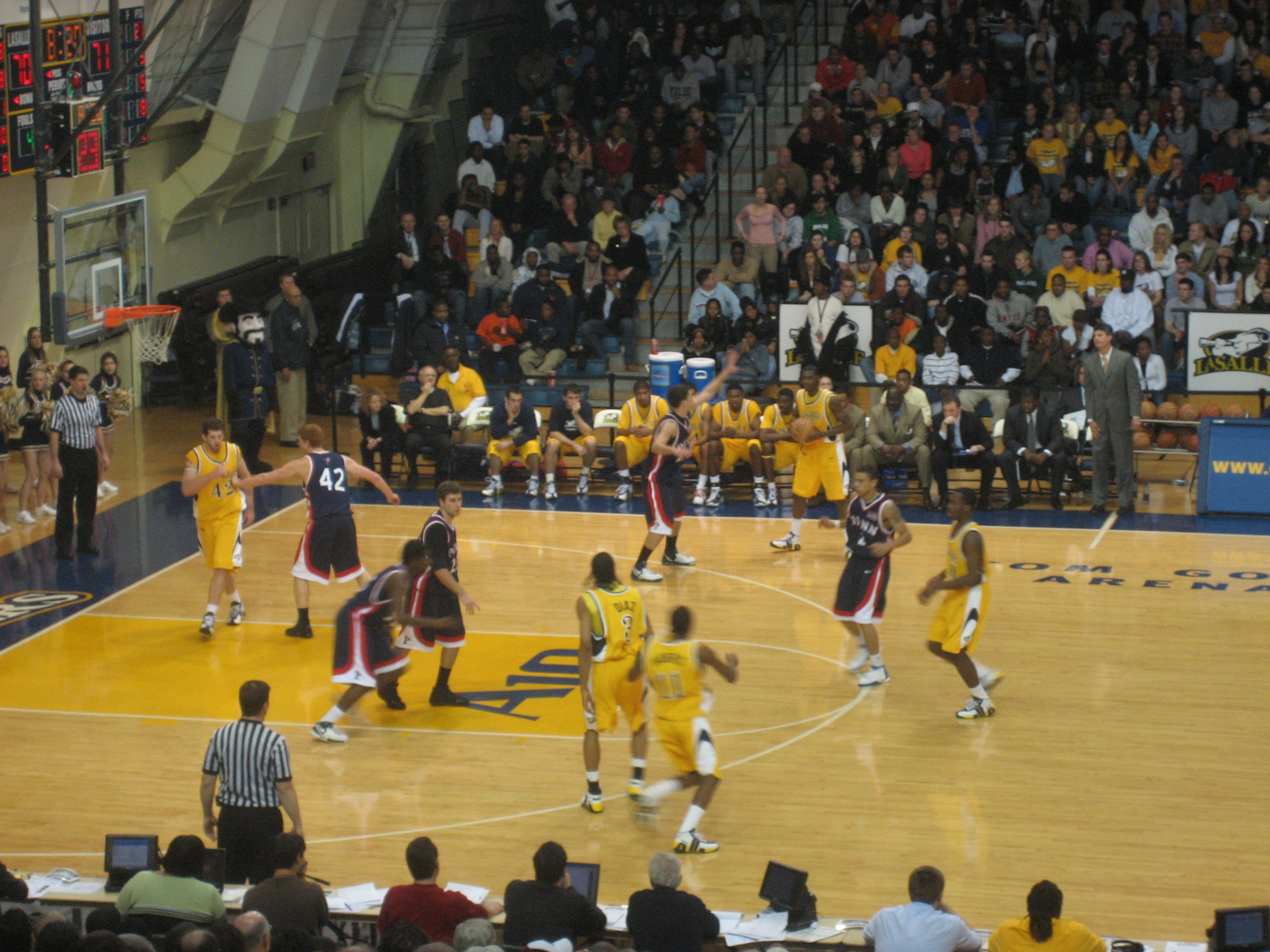
John Glaser Arena on the campus of La Salle University

==== Round-robin play (1955–2023) ====
Key
	Outright winner
	Shared winners
*	Full round-robin series not played

Season	Champion(s)	Record
1955–56	Saint Joseph's (1)	4–0
1956–57	La Salle (1); Saint Joseph's (2); Temple (1)	3–1
1957–58	Temple (2)	4–0
1958–59	Saint Joseph's (3)	4–0
1959–60	Saint Joseph's (4); Villanova (1)	3–1
1960–61	Saint Joseph's (5)	4–0
1961–62	Villanova (2)	4–0
1962–63	Penn (1); Villanova (3)	3–1
1963–64	La Salle (2)	3–1
1964–65	Saint Joseph's (6)	4–0
1965–66	Saint Joseph's (7)	4–0
1966–67	Villanova (4)	4–0
1967–68	Saint Joseph's (8)	3–1
1968–69	La Salle (3)	4–0
1969–70	Penn (2)	4–0
1970–71	Penn (3)	4–0
1971–72	Penn (4); Temple (3)	3–1
1972–73	Penn (5)	4–0
1973–74	Penn (6)	4–0
1974–75	La Salle (4)	4–0
1975–76	Saint Joseph's (9); Villanova (5)	3–1
1976–77	Penn (7); Temple (4)	3–1
1977–78	Temple (5); Villanova (6)	3–1
1978–79	Penn (8); Temple (6)	3–1
1979–80	Saint Joseph's (10)	4–0
1980–81	La Salle (5); Penn (9); Saint Joseph's (11); Temple (7); Villanova (7)	2–2
1981–82	Saint Joseph's (12); Temple (8)	3–1
1982–83	Villanova (8)	3–1
1983–84	La Salle (6); Temple (9)	3–1
1984–85	Villanova (9)	4–0
1985–86	Saint Joseph's (13); Temple (10)	3–1
1986–87	Temple (11)	4–0
1987–88	Temple (12)	4–0
1988–89	La Salle (7); Temple (13)	3–1
1989–90	La Salle (8)	4–0
1990–91	Saint Joseph's (14); Temple (14)	3–1
1991–92	La Salle (9); Penn (10); Saint Joseph's (15); Temple (15); Villanova (10)	1–1*
1992–93	Temple (16)	2–0*
1993–94	Penn (11); Temple (17)	2–0*
1994–95	Saint Joseph's (16); Temple (18)	2–0*
1995–96	Temple (19)	2–0*
1996–97	Temple (20); Villanova (11)	2–0*
1997–98	La Salle (10); Penn (12); Saint Joseph's (17); Temple (21); Villanova (12)	1–1*
1998–99	Villanova (13)	2–0*
1999–00	Temple (22); Villanova (14)	3–1
2000–01	Villanova (15)	4–0
2001–02	Penn (13)	4–0
2002–03	Saint Joseph's (18)	4–0
2003–04	Saint Joseph's (19)	4–0
2004–05	Temple (23); Villanova (16)	3–1
2005–06	Villanova (17)	4–0
2006–07	Villanova (18)	4–0
2007–08	Temple (24); Villanova (19)	3–1
2008–09	Villanova (20)	4–0
2009–10	Temple (25)	4–0
2010–11	Villanova (21)	4–0
2011–12	Saint Joseph's (20); Temple (26)	3–1
2012–13	La Salle (11); Temple (27)	3–1
2013–14	Villanova (22)	4–0
2014–15	Villanova (23)	4–0
2015–16	Villanova (24)	4–0
2016–17	Villanova (25)	4–0
2017–18	Villanova (26)	4–0
2018–19	Penn (14)	4–0
2019–20	Villanova (27)	4–0
2020–21	No winner (Note: Due to numerous cancellations and scheduling changes caused by the COVID-19 pandemic, no official men's Big 5 champion was recognized. La Salle and Villanova finished 1–0, Saint Joseph's finished 0–2, Temple did not play any Big 5 opponents, and Penn's entire season was canceled.)	
2021–22	Villanova (28)	3–0 (Note: Villanova's game against Temple was canceled due to a COVID-19 outbreak within the Temple program.)
2022–23	Temple (28); Villanova (29)	3–1

==== Big 5 Classic (2023–present) ====
Season	Tournament	Date	Pod 1 winner		Pod 2 winner		Venue	Attendance
2023–24	2023	December 2	Temple	65	**Saint Joseph's (21)**	**74**	Wells Fargo Center / Xfinity Mobile Arena	15,215
2024–25	2024	December 7	La Salle	68	**Saint Joseph's (22)**	**82**	Wells Fargo Center / Xfinity Mobile Arena	14,108
2025–26	2025	December 6	**Villanova (30)**	**90**	Penn	63	Wells Fargo Center / Xfinity Mobile Arena	10,361

==== Most championships ====
Key
**Bold**	Outright championship
†	All five schools tied

School	Championships (outright)	Years won
Villanova	30 (18)	1959–60, **1961–62**, 1962–63, **1966–67**, 1975–76, 1977–78, 1980–81†, **1982–83**, **1984–85**, 1991–92†, 1996–97, 1997–98†, **1998–99**, 1999–00, **2000–01**, 2004–05, **2005–06**, **2006–07**, 2007–08, **2008–09**, **2010–11**, **2013–14**, **2014–15**, **2015–16**, **2016–17**, **2017–18**, **2019–20**, **2021–22**, 2022–23, **2025–26**
Temple	28 (6)	1956–57, **1957–58**, 1971–72, 1976–77, 1977–78, 1978–79, 1980–81†, 1981–82, 1983–84, 1985–86, **1986–87**, **1987–88**, 1988–89, 1990–91, 1991–92†, **1992–93**, 1993–94, 1994–95, **1995–96**, 1996–97, 1997–98†, 1999–00, 2004–05, 2007–08, **2009–10**, 2011–12, 2012–13, 2022–23
Saint Joseph's	22 (11)	**1955–56**, 1956–57, **1958–59**, 1959–60, **1960–61**, **1964–65**, **1965–66**, **1967–68**, 1975–76, **1979–80**, 1980–81†, 1981–82, 1985–86, 1990–91, 1991–92†, 1994–95, 1997–98†, **2002–03**, **2003–04**, 2011–12, **2023–24**, **2024–25**
Penn	14 (6)	1962–63, **1969–70**, **1970–71**, 1971–72, **1972–73**, **1973–74**, 1976–77, 1978–79, 1980–81†, 1991–92†, 1993–94, 1997–98†, **2001–02**, **2018–19**
La Salle	11 (4)	1956–57, **1963–64**, **1968–69**, **1974–75**, 1980–81†, 1983–84, 1988–89, **1989–90**, 1991–92†, 1997–98†, 2012–13
Drexel	0 (0)	

=== Women ===
==== Round-robin play (1979–2024) ====
Key
Outright winner
Shared winners

Season	Champion(s)	Record
1979–80	Villanova (1)	4–0
1980–81	Villanova (2)	4–0
1981–82	Villanova (3)	4–0
1982–83	Temple (1)	4–0
1983–84	Saint Joseph's (1); Temple (2); Villanova (4)	3–1
1984–85	Saint Joseph's (2)	4–0
1985–86	Temple (3)	4-0
1986–87	La Salle (1); Saint Joseph's (3); Villanova (5)	3–1
1987–88	La Salle (2); Saint Joseph's (4); Villanova (6)	3–1
1988–89	La Salle (3)	4-0
1989–90	Saint Joseph's (5)	4–0
1990–91	Saint Joseph's (6)	4–0
1991–92	La Salle (4); Saint Joseph's (7); Villanova (7)	3–1
1992–93	Saint Joseph's (8)	4–0
1993–94	Saint Joseph's (9)	4–0
1994–95	Saint Joseph's (10)	4–0
1995–96	Villanova (8)	4–0
1996–97	Saint Joseph's (11)	4–0
1997–98	La Salle (5)	4–0
1998–99	Saint Joseph's (12)	4–0
1999–00	Saint Joseph's (13)	4–0
2000–01	Saint Joseph's (14)	4–0
2001–02	Temple (4)	4–0
2002–03	Villanova (9)	4–0
2003–04	Villanova (10)	4–0
2004–05	Temple (5)	4–0
2005–06	Temple (6)	4–0
2006–07	Temple (7)	4–0
2007–08	Temple (8)	4–0
2008–09	Saint Joseph's (15); Temple (9)	3–1
2009–10	Villanova (11)	4–0
2010–11	Temple (10)	4–0
2011–12	Villanova (12)	4–0
2012–13	Villanova (13)	4–0
2013–14	Saint Joseph's (16)	4–0
2014–15	Penn (1); Villanova (14)	3–1
2015–16	Villanova (15)	4–0
2016–17	Penn (2); Villanova (16)	3–1
2017–18	Villanova (17)	4–0
2018–19	Temple (11); Villanova (18)	3–1
2019–20	Villanova (19)	4–0
2020–21	No winner (Note: Due to numerous cancellations and scheduling changes caused by the COVID-19 pandemic, no official women's Big 5 champion was recognized. Villanova finished 2–0, Saint Joseph's finished 1–0, Temple finished 0–1, La Salle finished 0–2, and Penn's entire season was canceled.)	
2021–22	Villanova (20)	3–1
2022–23	Villanova (21)	4–0
2023–24	Saint Joseph's (17)	5–0

==== Big 5 Classic (2024–present) ====
Season	Tournament	Date	Pod 1 winner		Pod 2 winner		Venue	Attendance
2024–25	2024	December 6	**Temple (12)**	**76**	Villanova	62	Finneran Pavilion	1,526
2025–26	2025	December 7	Saint Joseph's	70	**Villanova (22)**	**76**	Finneran Pavilion	1,242

==== Most championships ====
Key
**Bold**	Outright championship

School	Championships (outright)	Years won
Villanova	22 (15)	**1979–80**, **1980–81**, **1981–82**, 1983–84, 1986–87, 1987–88, 1991–92, **1995–96**, **2002–03**, **2003–04**, **2009–10**, **2011–12**, **2012–13**, 2014–15, **2015–16**, 2016–17, **2017–18**, 2018–19, **2019–20**, **2021–22**, **2022–23**, **2025–26**
Saint Joseph's	17 (12)	1983–84, **1984–85**, 1986–87, 1987–88, **1989–90**, **1990–91**, 1991–92, **1992–93**, **1993–94**, **1994–95**, **1996–97**, **1998–99**, **1999–00**, **2000–01**, 2008–09, **2013–14**, **2023–24**
Temple	12 (9)	**1982–83**, 1983–84, **1985–86**, **2001–02**, **2004–05**, **2005–06**, **2006–07**, **2007–08**, 2008–09, **2010–11**, 2018–19, **2024–25**
La Salle	5 (2)	1986–87, 1987–88, **1988–89**, 1991–92, **1997–98**
Penn	2 (0)	2014–15, 2016–17
Drexel	0 (0)	

== Other uses ==
Although known primarily of an association of the Philadelphia college basketball teams, students from Big 5 schools also coordinate frequent student government meetings. The governments consist of La Salle, the University of Pennsylvania, Temple, Saint Joseph's, and Drexel. Prior to Drexel's admission to the Big 5, the school would typically be represented instead of Villanova due to meetings primarily revolving around issues in Philadelphia proper. Villanova is the only Big 5 college not located within the city limits.
