= Jim Boyle (basketball) =

American basketball player and coach (1942–2005)

Biographical details
- Born: June 9, 1942; Philadelphia, Pennsylvania, U.S.
- Died: December 23, 2005 (aged 63); Media, Pennsylvania, U.S.

Playing career
- 1961–1964: Saint Joseph's

Coaching career (HC unless noted)
- 1971–1973: Widener (assistant)
- 1973–1981: Saint Joseph's (assistant)
- 1981–1990: Saint Joseph's
- 1990–1992: Denver Nuggets (assistant)

Head coaching record
- Overall: 151–114 (.570)
- Tournaments: 1–2 (NCAA Division I); 1–2 (NIT)

Accomplishments and honors

Championships
- ECC tournament (1982); Atlantic 10 regular season (1986); Atlantic 10 tournament (1986)

Awards
- Atlantic 10 Coach of the Year (1986)

Jim Boyle (June 9, 1942 – December 23, 2005) was an American college basketball player and coach. He coached at Saint Joseph's from 1981 to 1990.

== Early life and playing career ==
Boyle grew up in Philadelphia. He attended West Catholic Preparatory High School, where his teammates included Jim Lynam and Herb Magee. As a senior in 1959, he helped lead the team to the city title. Boyle played college basketball at Saint Joseph's under Jack Ramsay. He led the team in rebounding as a junior, and was named a captain as a senior, averaging 11.6 points per game. Boyle graduated from Saint Joseph's in 1964.

== Coaching career ==
After graduating from Saint Joseph's, Boyle taught in the parochial school system in the Philadelphia area. In 1971, he was hired as an assistant at Widener. Boyle joined the staff at Saint Joseph's in 1973. In 1981, he helped the Hawks reach the Elite Eight.

On May 21, 1981, Boyle was hired as head coach at Saint Joseph's, replacing his high school teammate Jim Lynam, who left to join the Portland Trail Blazers organization. During his first season, the team finished 25–5 and won the East Coast Conference. In 1985, Boyle hired later Saint Joseph's coach Phil Martelli to his staff. During the 1985–86 season, Boyle led the team to a 26–6 record, Atlantic 10 championship, and NCAA Tournament appearance. The 26 wins were at the time a school-record, and Boyle was named Atlantic 10 coach of the year. He was given a ring for the season, which was lost until it was returned to his family in 2017. Boyle announced his resignation from the Hawks on December 22, 1989, effective at the end of the season, and finished with a record of 151–114.

In September 1990, Boyle was hired as an assistant coach for the Denver Nuggets of the NBA. He coached for two seasons under Paul Westhead. Boyle was fired in May 1992, when new coach Dan Issel opted not to retain him.

== Personal life and death ==
Boyle was married to Teresa and had four children, three of whom attended Saint Joseph's. His son, Kevin, played basketball at Harvard but died in the 1990s of a rare form of cancer. Boyle died of lung cancer at his home in Media, Pennsylvania, on December 23, 2005, at the age of 63.

His grandson Ryan Daly played basketball at Saint Joseph's after transferring from Delaware and is now an assistant coach at Bryant University.

== Head coaching record ==
Record table
Season	Team	Overall	Conference	Standing	Postseason
Saint Joseph's Hawks (East Coast Conference) (1981–1982)
1981–82	Saint Joseph's	25–5	10–1	2nd (East)	NCAA Division I First Round
Saint Joseph's Hawks (Atlantic 10 Conference) (1982–1990)
1982–83	Saint Joseph's	15–13	8–6	2nd (East)	
1983–84	Saint Joseph's	20–9	13–5	2nd	NIT First Round
1984–85	Saint Joseph's	19–12	13–5	3rd	NIT Second Round
1985–86	Saint Joseph's	26–6	16–2	1st	NCAA Division I Second Round
1986–87	Saint Joseph's	16–13	9–9	T–4th	
1987–88	Saint Joseph's	15–14	9–9	T–4th	
1988–89	Saint Joseph's	8–21	4–14	9th	
1989–90	Saint Joseph's	7–21	5–13	T–8th	
Saint Joseph's:		151–114 (.570)	87–64 (.576)		
Total:		151–114 (.570)			
National champion Postseason invitational champion Conference regular season champion Conference regular season and conference tournament champion Division regular season champion Division regular season and conference tournament champion Conference tournament champion
