= Ryan Daly =

American basketball player (born 1998)

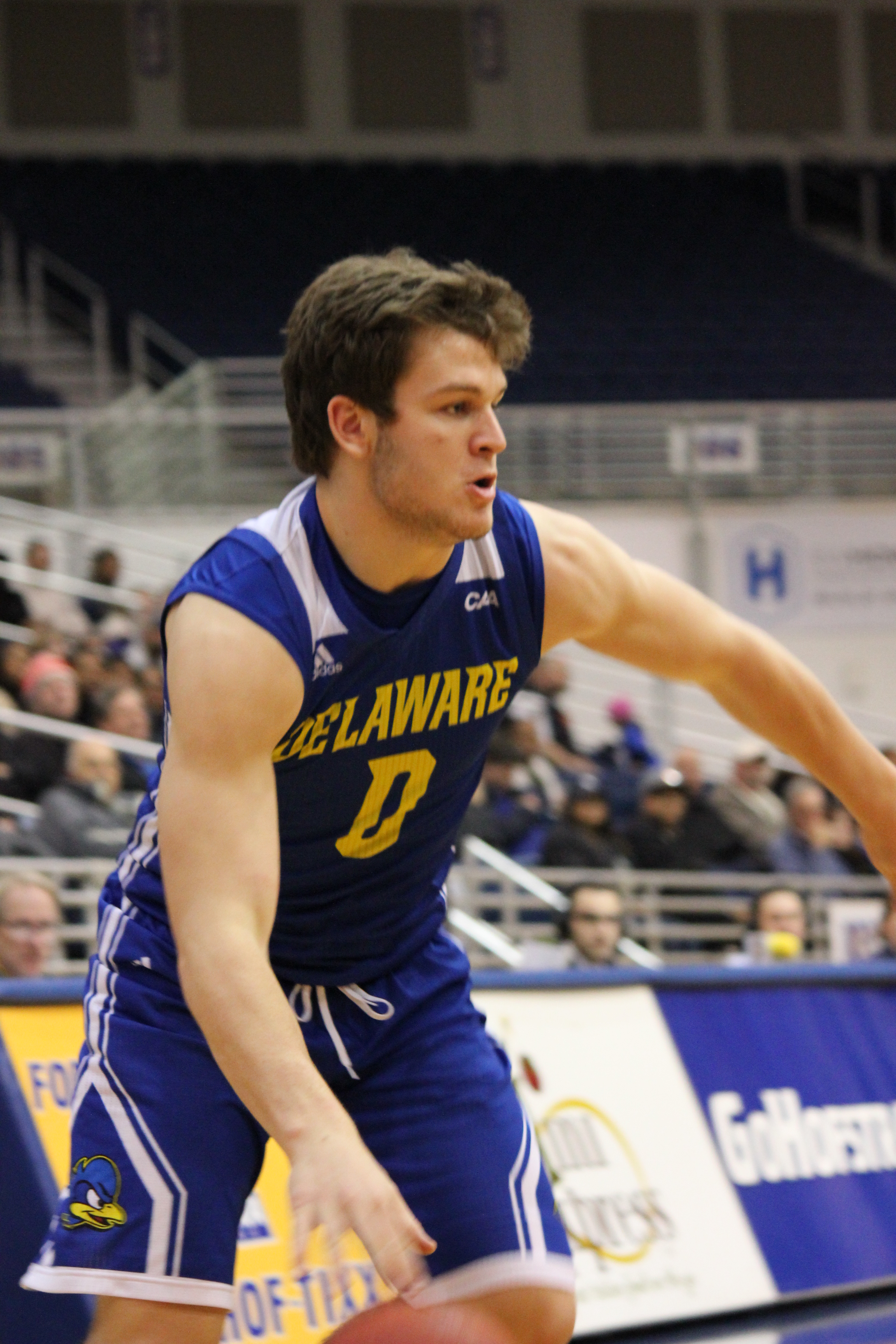
- Daly with Delaware in January 2018

Syracuse Orange
- Title: Assistant coach
- League: Atlantic Coast Conference

Personal information
- Born: January 6, 1998 (age 28)
- Listed height: 6 ft 5 in (1.96 m)
- Listed weight: 225 lb (102 kg)

Career information
- High school: Archbishop John Carroll (Radnor, Pennsylvania)
- College: Delaware (2016–2018); Saint Joseph's (2019–2021)
- NBA draft: 2021: undrafted
- Playing career: 2021–2022
- Position: Shooting guard / small forward
- Coaching career: 2022–present

Career history

Playing
- 2021: Maine Celtics
- 2021–2022: Agua Caliente Clippers

Coaching
- 2022–2024: Albany (assistant)
- 2024–2025: Bryant (assistant)
- 2025–2026: VCU (assistant)
- 2026–present: Syracuse (assistant)

Career highlights
- Third-team All-Atlantic 10 (2020); 2× Third-team All-CAA (2017, 2018); CAA Rookie of the Year (2017); CAA All-Rookie Team (2017)

Ryan Patrick Daly (born January 6, 1998) is an American basketball coach and former player who is currently an assistant coach for the Syracuse Orange of the Atlantic Coast Conference (ACC). He played college basketball for the Delaware Blue Hens and the Saint Joseph's Hawks.

== Early life ==
Ryan Daly helped the St. Denis Bulldawgs win the Region 32 Championship in 2010. Daly played for Archbishop John Carroll High School in Radnor, Pennsylvania, where he was teammates with future NBA player Derrick Jones Jr. In his junior season, he averaged 12.8 points per game, helping his team reach the Class AAA state title game. As a senior, Daly averaged 21.7 points and seven rebounds per game, making 65 three-pointers and leading his team to second place in the Philadelphia Catholic League. Daly was named Catholic League Most Valuable Player, Markward Club City Player of the Year, while earning Class AAA All-State First Team honors. He had originally committed to play college basketball for Hartford but never officially signed with the program. Daly switched his commitment to Delaware after Archbishop Carroll alum Martin Ingelsby was hired as its head coach.

== College career ==
=== Delaware ===
On January 7, 2017, Daly scored a freshman season-high 28 points for Delaware in a 91–81 loss to UNC Wilmington. He made a game-winning three-pointer with 12 seconds left, while recording 24 points and 12 rebounds, in a 68–67 victory over Drexel on February 16, 2017. He registered six double-doubles and set school freshman records for points and rebounds. Daly was named Colonial Athletic Association (CAA) Rookie of the Year, winning CAA Rookie of the Week six times, and earned Third Team All-CAA honors. As a freshman, he averaged 16 points, 7.4 rebounds and 2.1 assists per game. In his sophomore season, Daly averaged 17.5 points, 6.2 rebounds and 2.4 assists per game and was named to the Third Team All-CAA for his second straight year. Daly missed five games in February 2018 with a sprained ankle. He joined Devon Saddler and Jawan Carter as the only players in school history to reach 1,000 career points in their first two seasons, as he scored exactly 1,000. Following his sophomore season, Daly announced that he would transfer from Delaware.

=== Saint Joseph's ===
On April 9, 2018, Daly revealed that he was transferring to Saint Joseph's over offers from Temple and Xavier. He sat out his next season due to National Collegiate Athletic Association transfer rules. On January 11, 2020, Daly recorded 28 points and eight rebounds and made a game-tying circus shot from three-point range to force overtime in an 89–83 loss to Davidson. His shot was ranked number one on SportsCenter's Top 10 plays of the day. On February 1, Daly scored a career-high 35 points along with seven rebounds, six assists and three steals in a 78–73 loss to Saint Louis. As a junior, he averaged 20.6 points, 6.9 rebounds, 4.3 assists and 1.2 steals per game. He led the A10 conference in scoring, and led the Hawks in scoring, rebounding and assists. Daly averaged the most points by a Saint Joseph's player since Jameer Nelson in the 2003–04 season. He was named to the Third Team All-Atlantic 10 and First Team All-Big 5. After the season, Daly declared for the 2020 NBA draft, before withdrawing to return to Saint Joseph's for his redshirt senior year. He averaged a team-high18.5 points and 6.0 rebounds per game as a senior.

== Professional career ==
After going undrafted in the 2021 NBA draft, Daly signed with the Chicago Bulls for 2021 NBA Summer League. He was selected with the eighth pick of the second round of the 2021 NBA G League draft by the Motor City Cruise. However, he did not make the opening day roster. On December 21, 2021, Daly signed with the Maine Celtics, but was waived the next day after playing one game, being subsequently claimed off waivers by the Agua Caliente Clippers. On January 11, 2022, Daly was reacquired and then later waived by the Agua Caliente Clippers. Ryan was then hired by the University of Albany men's basketball team as an assistant coach in 2022. https://ualbanysports.com/sports/mens-basketball/roster/coaches/ryan-daly/2050. Ryan was hired at Bryant University as a men's basketball assistant coach in June 2024.

== Career statistics ==
Legend
GP	Games played	GS	Games started	MPG	Minutes per game
FG%	Field goal percentage	3P%	3-point field goal percentage	FT%	Free throw percentage
RPG	Rebounds per game	APG	Assists per game	SPG	Steals per game
BPG	Blocks per game	PPG	Points per game	**Bold**	Career high

=== College ===
Year	Team	GP	GS	MPG	FG%	3P%	FT%	RPG	APG	SPG	BPG	PPG
2016–17	Delaware	**32**	21	33.5	.425	**.339**	.683	**7.4**	2.1	.8	.3	16.0
2017–18	Delaware	28	28	**37.5**	**.431**	.311	.635	6.2	2.4	**1.2**	.1	17.5
2018–19	Saint Joseph's	Redshirt										
2019–20	Saint Joseph's	30	**30**	34.7	.424	.307	**.733**	6.9	**4.3**	**1.2**	**.4**	**20.5**
2020–21	Saint Joseph's	10	10	35.0	.425	.291	.684	6.0	2.5	1.1	**.4**	18.5
Career		100	89	35.1	.426	.417	.888	6.8	2.9	3.1	.3	18.0

== Personal life ==
Daly's father, Brian, played college basketball for Saint Joseph's from 1989 to 1992. He later coached in high school and college and was an assistant coach for Penn State. Daly's grandfather, Jim Boyle, played and served as head coach for Saint Joseph's, being inducted to the school's Basketball Hall of Fame, and was an assistant coach for the Denver Nuggets under Paul Westhead.
