= 1977–78 Penn Quakers men's basketball team =

American college basketball season

1977–78 Penn Quakers men's basketball

Ivy League champions

NCAA tournament, Sweet Sixteen
- Conference: Ivy League

Ranking
- AP: No. 20
- Record: 20–8 (12–2 Ivy)
- Head coach: Bob Weinhauer (1st season)
- Home arena: The Palestra

1977–78 Ivy League men's basketball standings
	Conf.				Overall
Team	W		L	PCT	W		L	PCT
No. 20 Penn	12	–	2	.857	20	–	8	.714
Princeton	11	–	3	.786	17	–	9	.654
Columbia	11	–	3	.786	15	–	11	.577
Harvard	7	–	7	.500	11	–	15	.423
Dartmouth	5	–	9	.357	10	–	16	.385
Cornell	5	–	9	.357	9	–	17	.346
Yale	3	–	11	.214	8	–	16	.333
Brown	2	–	12	.143	4	–	22	.154
Rankings from AP Poll

The 1977–78 Penn Quakers men's basketball team was a college basketball team that represented the University of Pennsylvania in the 1977–78 NCAA Division I men's basketball season. The Quakers, coached by Bob Weinhauer, played in the Ivy League and had a 20–8 win–loss record. Penn won the Ivy League regular season championship for the seventh time in nine years and participated in the 1978 NCAA Division I basketball tournament. The Quakers defeated St. Bonaventure in the opening round before falling to eventual National runner-up Duke, 84–80, in the East Regional Semifinal.

== Roster ==
1977–78 Penn Quakers men's basketball team
Players
Coaches

Pos.	#	Name	Height	Weight	Year	Previous school	Hometown
G/F	15	Tony Price	6 ft 6 in (1.98 m)	190 lb (86 kg)	Jr	William Howard Taft	New York City, New York
F	33	Tim Smith	6 ft 5 in (1.96 m)	—	Jr
F		Keven McDonald	6 ft 5 in (1.96 m)	—	Sr	Seton Hall	Bloomfield, New Jersey
G		Tom Crowley	6 ft 3 in (1.91 m)	—	Sr
C		Matthew White	6 ft 10 in (2.08 m)	—	Jr	Choate
G		Stan Greene	6 ft 3 in (1.91 m)	—	Sr
G		Bobby Willis	6 ft 2 in (1.88 m)	—	Jr
G		James Salters	5 ft 11 in (1.8 m)	—	So
F		Ed Kuhl	6 ft 5 in (1.96 m)	—	Jr
G		James Brown	6 ft 3 in (1.91 m)	—	Jr
F		Bruce Bergwall	6 ft 7 in (2.01 m)	—	So

Head coach

- Bob Weinhauer

Assistant coach(es)

- Dennis Jackson
- Bob Staak

Legend

- (C) Team captain
- (S) Suspended
- (I) Ineligible
- (W) Walk-on
- Injured
- Current redshirt

== Schedule and results ==
Date time, TV	Rank^{#}	Opponent^{#}	Result	Record	Site city, state
Regular season
Dec 3, 1977*		Navy	W 83–69	1–0	The Palestra; Philadelphia, Pennsylvania
Dec 7, 1977*		at Virginia	L 63–70	1–1	University Hall; Charlottesville, Virginia
Dec 10, 1977*		vs. Villanova	L 68–69	1–2	The Palestra
Dec 17, 1977*		at La Salle	W 78–75	2–2	The Palestra; Philadelphia, Pennsylvania
Dec 22, 1977*		vs. Oklahoma	L 74–80	2–3	Carolina Coliseum; Columbia, South Carolina
Dec 23, 1977*		vs. USC	W 88–71	3–3	Carolina Coliseum; Columbia, South Carolina
Jan 3, 1978		at Princeton	W 78–63	4–3 (1–0)	Jadwin Gymnasium; Princeton, New Jersey
Jan 6, 1978		Harvard	W 86–81	5–3 (2–0)	The Palestra; Philadelphia, Pennsylvania
Jan 7, 1978		Dartmouth	W 74–51	6–3 (3–0)	The Palestra; Philadelphia, Pennsylvania
Jan 10, 1978*		at The Citadel	W 103–73	7–3	McAlister Field House; Charleston, South Carolina
Jan 14, 1978*		at No. 14 Providence	L 65–67	7–4	Providence Civic Center; Providence, Rhode Island
Jan 17, 1978*		at Richmond	W 87–66	8–4	Robins Center; Richmond, Virginia
Jan 21, 1978*		Furman	W 99–92	9–4	The Palestra; Philadelphia, Pennsylvania
Jan 25, 1978*		Saint Joseph's	W 80–69	10–4	The Palestra; Philadelphia, Pennsylvania
Jan 28, 1978		Princeton	W 49–44	11–4 (4–0)	The Palestra; Philadelphia, Pennsylvania
Feb 3, 1978		Cornell	W 82–72	12–4 (5–0)	The Palestra; Philadelphia, Pennsylvania
Feb 4, 1978		Columbia	W 81–58	13–4 (6–0)	The Palestra; Philadelphia, Pennsylvania
Feb 10, 1978		at Yale	W 96–78	14–4 (7–0)	Payne Whitney Gymnasium; New Haven, Connecticut
Feb 11, 1978		at Brown	W 108–73	15–4 (8–0)	Marvel Gymnasium; Providence, Rhode Island
Feb 17, 1978		at Dartmouth	W 60–58	16–4 (9–0)	Alumni Gym; Hanover, New Hampshire
Feb 18, 1978		at Harvard	L 87–93	16–5 (9–1)	Lavietes Pavilion; Boston, Massachusetts
Feb 21, 1978*		Temple	L 56–71	16–6	The Palestra; Philadelphia, Pennsylvania
Feb 24, 1978		Brown	W 91–75	17–6 (10–1)	The Palestra; Philadelphia, Pennsylvania
Feb 25, 1978		Yale	W 67–59	18–6 (11–1)	The Palestra; Philadelphia, Pennsylvania
Mar 3, 1978		at Columbia	L 84–88	18–7 (11–2)	Levien Gymnasium; Manhattan, New York
Mar 4, 1978		at Cornell	W 98–74	19–7 (12–2)	Barton Hall; Ithaca, New York
NCAA tournament
Mar 12, 1978*	(E 4Q) No. 20	vs. (E 2L) St. Bonaventure; First round	W 92–83	20–7	The Palestra; Philadelphia, Pennsylvania
Mar 17, 1978*	(E 4Q) No. 20	vs. (E 1Q) No. 7 Duke; East Regional Semifinals – Sweet Sixteen	L 80–84	20–8	Providence Civic Center; Providence, Rhode Island
*Non-conference game. ^{#}Rankings from AP Poll. (#) Tournament seedings in parentheses. E=East. All times are in Eastern Time.
