= 1981–82 Penn Quakers men's basketball team =

American college basketball season

1981–82 Penn Quakers men's basketball

Ivy League champions

NCAA tournament, First round
- Conference: Ivy League
- Record: 17–10 (12–2 Ivy)
- Head coach: Bob Weinhauer (5th season)
- Home arena: The Palestra

1981–82 Ivy League men's basketball standings
	Conf.				Overall
Team	W		L	PCT	W		L	PCT
Penn	12	–	2	.857	17	–	10	.630
Columbia	9	–	5	.643	16	–	10	.615
Princeton	9	–	5	.643	13	–	13	.500
Yale	7	–	7	.500	13	–	13	.500
Cornell	7	–	7	.500	10	–	16	.385
Harvard	6	–	8	.429	11	–	15	.423
Brown	5	–	9	.357	5	–	21	.192
Dartmouth	1	–	13	.071	7	–	19	.269
Rankings from AP Poll

The 1981–82 Penn Quakers men's basketball team represented the University of Pennsylvania during the 1981–82 NCAA Division I men's basketball season. The Quakers, coached by Bob Weinhauer, played in the Ivy League and had a 17–10 record (12–2 Ivy League).

== Roster ==
1981–82 Penn Quakers men's basketball team
Players	Coaches
Pos. / # / Name / Height / Weight / Year / Hometown; F / 11 / Paul Little / 6 ft 5 in (1.96 m) / 185 lb (84 kg) / Jr / Dorchester, Boston	Head coach: Bob Weinhauer; Assistant coach(es) Legend: (C) Team captain; (S) Suspended; (I) Ineligible; (W) Walk-on; Injured; Current redshirt

== Schedule ==
Date time, TV	Rank^{#}	Opponent^{#}	Result	Record	Site city, state
Non-conference regular Season
Dec 5, 1981*		at Stanford	W 71–63	3–0	Maples Pavilion; Stanford, California
Dec 12, 1981*		Villanova	L 61–75	3–1	The Palestra; Philadelphia, Pennsylvania
Dec 17, 1981*		vs. No. 3 Louisville; Suntory Bowl	L 68–76	3–2	Tokyo, Japan
Dec 18, 1981*		vs. No. 20 Oregon State; Suntory Bowl	L 64–102	3–3	Tokyo, Japan
Ivy League regular season
Feb 9, 1982*		vs. Temple	W 59–56	8–9	
Mar 6, 1982		at Columbia	W 45–43	17–9 (12–2)	Levien Gymnasium; New York, New York
NCAA tournament
Mar 12, 1982*	(12 E)	vs. (5 E) St. John's; First round	L 56–66	17–10	Nassau Coliseum; Uniondale, New York
*Non-conference game. ^{#}Rankings from AP poll. (#) Tournament seedings in parentheses. E=East. All times are in Eastern Time.

== Awards and honors ==
- Paul Little – Ivy League co-Player of the Year
