= 1977–78 Yale Bulldogs men's basketball team =

American college basketball season

1977–78 Yale Bulldogs men's basketball
- Conference: Ivy League
- Record: 8–16 (3–11 Ivy)
- Head coach: Ray Carazo (3rd season)
- Home arena: John J. Lee Amphitheater

1977–78 Ivy League men's basketball standings
	Conf.				Overall
Team	W		L	PCT	W		L	PCT
No. 20 Penn	12	–	2	.857	20	–	8	.714
Princeton	11	–	3	.786	17	–	9	.654
Columbia	11	–	3	.786	15	–	11	.577
Harvard	7	–	7	.500	11	–	15	.423
Dartmouth	5	–	9	.357	10	–	16	.385
Cornell	5	–	9	.357	9	–	17	.346
Yale	3	–	11	.214	8	–	16	.333
Brown	2	–	12	.143	4	–	22	.154
Rankings from AP Poll

The 1977–78 Yale Bulldogs men's basketball team represented Yale University during the 1977–78 men's college basketball season. The Bulldogs, led by 3rd year head coach Ray Carazo, played their home games at John J. Lee Amphitheater of the Payne Whitney Gymnasium and were members of the Ivy League. They finished the season 8–16, 3–11 in Ivy League play to finish in seventh place.

== Schedule ==
Date time, TV	Rank^{#}	Opponent^{#}	Result	Record	Site city, state
November 29*		Lafayette	L 52–66	0–1	Payne Whitney Gymnasium; New Haven, CT
December 3*		at Connecticut	L 57–73	0–2	Hugh S. Greer Field House; Storrs, CT
December 7		at Brown	W 73–66	1–2 (1–0)	Marvel Gymnasium; Providence, RI
December 10*		Holy Cross	L 62–67	1–3 (1–0)	Payne Whitney Gymnasium; New Haven, CT
December 12*		Fordham	W 83–72	2–3 (1–0)	Payne Whitney Gymnasium; New Haven, CT
December 28*		vs. Rochester	W 72–50	3–3 (1–0)	Blue Cross Arena; Rochester, NY
December 29*		vs. DePaul	L 52–100	3–4 (1–0)	Blue Cross Arena; Rochester, NY
January 7*		Clark	W 70–66	4–4 (1–0)	Payne Whitney Gymnasium; New Haven, CT
January 10*		at Colgate	W 91–60	5–4 (1–0)	Cotterell Court; Hamilton, NY
January 14*		Fairfield	L 72–73	5–5 (1–0)	Payne Whitney Gymnasium; New Haven, CT
January 17*		Williams	W 69–57	6–5 (1–0)	Payne Whitney Gymnasium; New Haven, CT
January 27		Columbia	L 51–55	6–6 (1–1)	Payne Whitney Gymnasium; New Haven, CT
January 28		Cornell	L 64–88	6–7 (1–2)	Payne Whitney Gymnasium; New Haven, CT
February 3		at Dartmouth	L 45–71	6–8 (1–3)	Alumni Gym; Hanover, NH
February 4		at Harvard	L 74–76	6–9 (1–4)	Lavietes Pavilion; Boston, Massachusetts
February 7		Brown	W 74–57	7–9 (2–4)	Payne Whitney Gymnasium; New Haven, CT
February 10		Penn	L 78–96	7–10 (2–5)	Payne Whitney Gymnasium; New Haven, CT
February 11		Princeton	L 49–72	7–11 (2–6)	Payne Whitney Gymnasium; New Haven, CT
February 17		at Cornell	L 63–71	7–12 (2–7)	Barton Hall; Ithaca, NY
February 18		at Columbia	L 71–88	7–13 (2–8)	Levien Gymnasium; Manhattan, NY
February 24		at Princeton	L 49–52	7–14 (2–9)	Jadwin Gymnasium; Princeton, NJ
February 25		at Penn	L 59–67	7–15 (2–10)	Palestra; Philadelphia, Pennsylvania
March 3		Harvard	W 77–69	8–15 (3–10)	Payne Whitney Gymnasium; New Haven, CT
March 4		Dartmouth	L 40–42	8–16 (3–11)	Payne Whitney Gymnasium; New Haven, CT
*Non-conference game. ^{#}Rankings from AP poll. (#) Tournament seedings in parentheses. All times are in Eastern Time.
