= 1981–82 Drexel Dragons men's basketball team =

1981–82 Drexel Dragons men's basketball
- Conference: East Coast Conference
- East
- Record: 19–11 (7–4 ECC)
- Head coach: Eddie Burke (5th season)
- Home arena: Daskalakis Athletic Center

1981–82 ECC men's basketball standings
	Conf.				Overall
Team	W		L	PCT	W		L	PCT
East
Temple	11	–	0	1.000	19	–	8	.704
Saint Joseph's †	10	–	1	.909	25	–	5	.833
American	8	–	3	.727	21	–	9	.700
La Salle	7	–	4	.636	16	–	13	.552
Drexel	7	–	4	.636	19	–	11	.633
Hofstra	4	–	7	.364	12	–	16	.429
West
West Chester	8	–	8	.500	13	–	14	.481
Rider	7	–	9	.438	11	–	16	.407
Lafayette	7	–	9	.438	12	–	15	.444
Delaware	6	–	10	.375	9	–	17	.346
Bucknell	3	–	13	.188	7	–	20	.259
Lehigh	3	–	13	.188	9	–	17	.346
† 1982 ECC tournament winner Rankings from AP poll

The 1981–82 Drexel Dragons men's basketball team represented Drexel University during the 1981–82 NCAA Division I men's basketball season. The Dragons, led by 5th year head coach Eddie Burke, played their home games at the Daskalakis Athletic Center and were members of the East Coast Conference (ECC).

The team finished the season 19–11, and finished in 4th place in the ECC East in the regular season.

Drexel reached the finals of the ECC tournament, where they lost to Saint Joseph's.

== Roster ==
1981–82 Drexel Dragons men's basketball team
Players
Coaches

Pos.	#	Name	Height	Weight	Year	Previous school	Hometown
F		Richard Congo	6 ft 7 in (2.01 m)	—	So
G		Leslie Alston	5 ft 1 in (1.55 m)	—	Fr
G		Rob O'Loughlin	6 ft 0 in (1.83 m)	—	So
F		Charles Hickman	6 ft 7 in (2.01 m)	—	Fr
G		Mike Moran	6 ft 2 in (1.88 m)	—	Sr
F		Randy Burkert	6 ft 6 in (1.98 m)	—	Sr	Phoenixville
C		Brian Anderson	6 ft 8 in (2.03 m)	—	Sr
G		John Siorek	6 ft 0 in (1.83 m)	—	Jr
F		Mike Mitchell	6 ft 9 in (2.06 m)	—	So
G		Derrick Joynes	6 ft 2 in (1.88 m)	—	Sr
F		Mike McIntyre	6 ft 7 in (2.01 m)	—	Jr
F		Joe Petrone	6 ft 4 in (1.93 m)	—	Jr
F		John Van Nieda	6 ft 7 in (2.01 m)	—	Sr

Head coach

- Eddie Burke (La Salle)

Assistant coach(es)

Legend

- (C) Team captain
- (S) Suspended
- (I) Ineligible
- (W) Walk-on
- Injured
- Current redshirt

== Schedule ==
Date time, TV	Rank^{#}	Opponent^{#}	Result	Record	High points	High rebounds	High assists	Site (attendance) city, state
Regular season
November 28, 1981		at Delaware	W 56–49	1–0 (1–0)	–	–	–	Delaware Field House (377); Newark, DE
November 30, 1981		West Chester	W 72–64	2–0 (2–0)	–	–	–	Daskalakis Athletic Center (400); Philadelphia, PA
December 4, 1981*		vs. Vermont; James Madison Invitational semifinal	L 74–75	2–1	–	–	–	Godwin Hall (2,500); Harrisonburg, VA
December 5, 1981*		vs. Bucknell; James Madison Invitational 3rd place	L 75–76	2–2	–	–	–	Godwin Hall (4,200); Harrisonburg, VA
December 8, 1981*		at Boston University	L 70–76	2–3	–	–	–	Case Gym (621); Boston, MA
December 19, 1981*		at St. Francis (PA)	W 76–67	3–3	–	–	–	DeGol Arena (1,202); Loretto, PA
December 22, 1981*		at Providence	L 50–61	3–4	–	–	–	Providence Civic Center (5,154); Providence, RI
December 28, 1981*		vs. Alaska Anchorage; Music City Festival semifinals	L 55–63	3–5	–	–	–	Memorial Gymnasium (9,132); Nashville, TN
December 29, 1981*		vs. Austin Peay; Music City Festival 3rd place	W 72–57	4–5	–	–	–	Memorial Gymnasium (4,567); Nashville, TN
January 6, 1982*		at Marist	W 68–66 ^{OT}	5–5	–	–	–	McCann Arena (731); Poughkeepsie, NY
January 9, 1982		American	W 81–75	6–5 (3–0)	–	–	–	Daskalakis Athletic Center (1,022); Philadelphia, PA
January 11, 1982*		Allentown	W 78–51	7–5	–	–	–	Daskalakis Athletic Center (531); Philadelphia, PA
January 13, 1982		Lehigh	W 76–51	8–5 (4–0)	–	–	–	Daskalakis Athletic Center (276); Philadelphia, PA
January 16, 1982*		Northeastern	W 74–68	9–5	–	–	–	Daskalakis Athletic Center (976); Philadelphia, PA
January 18, 1982		Bucknell	W 79–62	10–5 (5–0)	–	–	–	Daskalakis Athletic Center (1,015); Philadelphia, PA
January 20, 1982*		at Loyola (MD)	L 67–73	10–6	–	–	–	Evergreen Gymnasium (550); Baltimore, MD
January 23, 1982		at Lafayette	W 68–64 ^{OT}	11–6 (6–0)	–	–	–	Kirby Field House (1,950); Easton, PA
January 27, 1982*		at Fairleigh Dickinson	W 77–67	12–6	–	–	–	FDU Gym (150); Hackensack, NJ
January 30, 1982*		Maine	W 65–57	13–6	–	–	–	Daskalakis Athletic Center (829); Philadelphia, PA
February 3, 1982*		Niagara	W 76–65	14–6	–	–	–	Daskalakis Athletic Center (1,008); Philadelphia, PA
February 6, 1982		Temple	L 44–64	14–7 (6–1)	–	–	–	Daskalakis Athletic Center (2,708); Philadelphia, PA
February 10, 1982		Saint Joseph's	L 71–93	14–8 (6–2)	–	–	–	Daskalakis Athletic Center (2,983); Philadelphia, PA
February 13, 1982		Hofstra	W 78–63	15–8 (7–2)	–	–	–	Daskalakis Athletic Center (305); Philadelphia, PA
February 16, 1982		at Rider	L 51–52	15–9 (7–3)	–	–	–	Alumni Gym (350); Lawrenceville, NJ
February 20, 1982*		Robert Morris	W 77–68	16–9	–	–	–	Daskalakis Athletic Center (467); Philadelphia, PA
February 24, 1982; 7:00 pm		at La Salle	L 55–57	16–10 (7–4)	–	–	–	Palestra (7,391); Philadelphia, PA
ECC Tournament
March 5, 1982	(9)	at (8) Delaware; First round	W 49–45	17–10	–	–	–	Delaware Field House (482); Newark, DE
March 6, 1982	(9)	at (1) Temple; Quarterfinal	W 61–55	18–10	–	–	–	McGonigle Hall (1,600); Philadelphia, PA
March 7, 1982	(9)	vs. (5) American; Semifinal	W 68–62 ^{OT}	19–10	–	–	–	Palestra (5,083); Philadelphia, PA
March 8, 1982	(9)	vs. (2) Saint Joseph's; Championship	L 65–75	19–11	–	–	–	Palestra (4,483); Philadelphia, PA
*Non-conference game. ^{#}Rankings from AP. (#) Tournament seedings in parentheses. All times are in Eastern Time.

== Awards ==
Randy Burkert

- ECC All-Conference Second Team

Charles Hickman

- ECC All-Rookie Team
