= City 6 =

Informal association of college athletic programs

City 6 Logo

The City 6 is an informal association of college athletic programs in the Philadelphia area. It is an intra-city intramural competition, but it is also used as a colloquial term to describe all the NCAA Division I schools in the Philadelphia area.

The colleges in the City 6 are all of the traditional Philadelphia Big 5 schools—La Salle University, Saint Joseph's University (SJU), Temple University, the University of Pennsylvania, and Villanova University—along with Drexel University, which was formally added to the Big 5 rivalry after the 2022–23 basketball season.

The City 6 Extramural Classic features the best intramural teams from each school competing against one another. The classic was founded in 1986 by representatives from Saint Joseph's and Temple. Games between the intramural programs are held at such locations as SJU's Hagan Arena, Penn's Franklin Field, and Villanova Stadium.

The sports are flag football, volleyball, basketball, and softball. Each sport includes competition for men, women, and co-ed.

Over 13,000 intramural participants competed in City 6 events between 1986 and 2006.

== Varsity basketball ==
Each spring, the basketball coaches of the six schools sit together and are speakers at the Coaches vs. Cancer Tourney Tip-Off Breakfast, to raise money for the American Cancer Society.

== Institutions ==
| Institution | Location | Founded | Affiliation | Enrollment | Year joined | Nickname | Conference |
|---|---|---|---|---|---|---|---|
| Drexel University | West Philadelphia | 1891 | Private | 25,500 | 1986 | Dragons | Coastal Athletic Association |
| La Salle University | Upper North Philadelphia extending into Northwest Philadelphia | 1863 | Private/Catholic | 7,554 | 1995 | Explorers | Atlantic 10 |
| Saint Joseph's University | West Philadelphia/Lower Merion Township | 1851 | Private/Catholic | 8,800 | 1986 | Hawks | Atlantic 10 |
| Temple University | North Philadelphia | 1884 | Public | 38,648 | 1986 | Owls | American Athletic Conference |
| University of Pennsylvania | West Philadelphia | 1740 | Private | 21,329 | 1986 | Quakers | Ivy League |
| Villanova University | Villanova, PA | 1842 | Private/Catholic | 10,482 | 1986 | Wildcats | Big East |
