= 1982 East Coast Conference (Division I) men's basketball tournament =

Basketball Tournament

- Classification: Division I
- Season: 1981–82
- Teams: 12
- First round site: Home Courts
- Quarterfinals site: Home Courts
- Semifinals site: Palestra; Philadelphia, PA
- Finals site: Palestra; Philadelphia, PA
- Champions: Saint Joseph's (2nd title)
- Winning coach: Jim Boyle (1st title)

1981–82 ECC men's basketball standings
	Conf.				Overall
Team	W		L	PCT	W		L	PCT
East
Temple	11	–	0	1.000	19	–	8	.704
Saint Joseph's †	10	–	1	.909	25	–	5	.833
American	8	–	3	.727	21	–	9	.700
La Salle	7	–	4	.636	16	–	13	.552
Drexel	7	–	4	.636	19	–	11	.633
Hofstra	4	–	7	.364	12	–	16	.429
West
West Chester	8	–	8	.500	13	–	14	.481
Rider	7	–	9	.438	11	–	16	.407
Lafayette	7	–	9	.438	12	–	15	.444
Delaware	6	–	10	.375	9	–	17	.346
Bucknell	3	–	13	.188	7	–	20	.259
Lehigh	3	–	13	.188	9	–	17	.346
† 1982 ECC tournament winner Rankings from AP poll

The 1982 East Coast Conference men's basketball tournament was held March 5–7, 1982. The champion gained and an automatic berth to the NCAA tournament.

== Bracket and results ==
First round Friday, March 5
8	Delaware	45
9	Drexel	49
5	American	84
12	Lehigh	56
6	Lafayette	64
11	Hofstra	71
7	La Salle	81
10	Bucknell	72

Quarterfinals; Saturday, March 6
1	Temple	55
9	Drexel	61
4	Rider	65
5	American	71
3	Saint Joseph's	65
11	Hofstra	57
2	West Chester	56
7	La Salle	71

Semifinals; Sunday, March 7
9	Drexel	68*
5	American	62
3	Saint Joseph's	83
7	La Salle	71

Championship; Monday, March 8
9	Drexel	65
2	Saint Joseph's	75

* denotes overtime game
