= 1981–82 Saint Joseph's Hawks men's basketball team =

American college basketball season

1981–82 Saint Joseph's Hawks men's basketball

ECC tournament champions

NCAA tournament
- Conference: East Coast Conference
- Record: 25–5 (10–1 ECC)
- Head coach: Jim Boyle (1st season)
- Home arena: Alumni Memorial Fieldhouse

1981–82 ECC men's basketball standings
	Conf.				Overall
Team	W		L	PCT	W		L	PCT
East
Temple	11	–	0	1.000	19	–	8	.704
Saint Joseph's †	10	–	1	.909	25	–	5	.833
American	8	–	3	.727	21	–	9	.700
La Salle	7	–	4	.636	16	–	13	.552
Drexel	7	–	4	.636	19	–	11	.633
Hofstra	4	–	7	.364	12	–	16	.429
West
West Chester	8	–	8	.500	13	–	14	.481
Rider	7	–	9	.438	11	–	16	.407
Lafayette	7	–	9	.438	12	–	15	.444
Delaware	6	–	10	.375	9	–	17	.346
Bucknell	3	–	13	.188	7	–	20	.259
Lehigh	3	–	13	.188	9	–	17	.346
† 1982 ECC tournament winner Rankings from AP poll

The 1981–82 Saint Joseph's Hawks men's basketball team represented Saint Joseph's University as a member of the East Coast Conference during the 1981–82 NCAA Division I men's basketball season. Led by first-year head coach Jim Boyle, the Hawks finished with an overall record of 25–8 (9–2 in ECC play). Saint Joseph's won the ECC tournament, and received an automatic bid to the NCAA tournament as No. 6 seed in the East region. The team was defeated by No. 11 seed Northeastern in the opening round.

== Roster ==
1981–82 Saint Joseph's Hawks men's basketball team
Players
Coaches

Pos.	#	Name	Height	Weight	Year	Previous school	Hometown
G	13	Bryan Warrick	6 ft 5 in (1.96 m)	—	Sr		Burlington Township, New Jersey
F	34	Lonnie McFarlan	6 ft 5 in (1.96 m)	—	So
C	23	Tony Costner	6 ft 10 in (2.08 m)	—	So

Head coach

- Jim Boyle

Assistant coach(es)

Legend

- (C) Team captain
- (S) Suspended
- (I) Ineligible
- (W) Walk-on
- Injured
- Current redshirt

== Schedule and results ==
Date time, TV	Rank^{#}	Opponent^{#}	Result	Record	Site city, state
Regular season
Dec 2, 1981*		Rider	W 76–53	1–0	Alumni Memorial Fieldhouse; Philadelphia, Pennsylvania
Dec 4, 1981*		vs. North Texas; Carrier Classic	W 73–69	2–0	Carrier Dome; Syracuse, New York
Dec 5, 1981*		at Syracuse; Carrier Classic	W 59–57	3–0	Carrier Dome; Syracuse, New York
Dec 9, 1981*		Bradley	L 45–58	3–1	Alumni Memorial Fieldhouse; Philadelphia, Pennsylvania
Dec 11, 1981*		vs. Cal State Fullerton	W 63–59	4–1	
Jan 12, 1982*		vs. Penn	W 79–56	10–2	
Feb 3, 1982*		at No. 4 DePaul	L 44–46	15–4	Allstate Arena (12,283); Rosemont, Illinois
Feb 6, 1982*		Old Dominion	W 69–63	16–4	Alumni Memorial Fieldhouse (4,834); Philadelphia, Pennsylvania
ECC Tournament
Mar 6, 1982*		Hofstra; Quarterfinals	W 65–57	23–4	Alumni Memorial Fieldhouse; Philadelphia, Pennsylvania
Mar 7, 1982*		vs. La Salle; Semifinals	W 83–71	24–4	The Palestra; Philadelphia, Pennsylvania
Mar 8, 1982*		vs. Drexel; Championship game	W 75–65	25–4	The Palestra; Philadelphia, Pennsylvania
NCAA Tournament
Mar 12, 1982*	(6 E)	vs. (11 E) Northeastern; First round	L 62–63	25–5	Nassau Coliseum; Uniondale, New York
*Non-conference game. ^{#}Rankings from AP poll. (#) Tournament seedings in parentheses. E=East.
