= 1985–86 West Virginia Mountaineers men's basketball team =

American college basketball season

1985–86 West Virginia Mountaineers men's basketball

NCAA tournament
- Conference: Atlantic-10 Conference
- Record: 22–11 (15–3 A-10)
- Head coach: Gale Catlett (8th season)
- Home arena: WVU Coliseum

1985–86 Atlantic 10 men's basketball standings
	Conf.				Overall
Team	W		L	PCT	W		L	PCT
Saint Joseph's†	16	–	2	.889	26	–	6	.813
West Virginia	15	–	3	.833	22	–	11	.667
Temple	15	–	3	.833	25	–	6	.806
St. Bonaventure	10	–	8	.556	15	–	13	.536
Duquesne	9	–	9	.500	15	–	14	.517
George Washington	7	–	11	.389	12	–	16	.429
UMass	6	–	12	.333	9	–	9	.500
Rhode Island	5	–	13	.278	9	–	19	.321
Penn State	5	–	13	.278	12	–	17	.414
Rutgers	2	–	16	.111	8	–	21	.276
† 1986 Atlantic 10 Tournament winner Rankings from AP Poll

The 1985–86 West Virginia Mountaineers men's basketball team represented West Virginia University as a member of the Atlantic-10 Conference during the 1985–86 season. The team played their home games at WVU Coliseum in Morgantown, West Virginia. Led by 8th-year head coach Gale Catlett, the Mountaineers finished tied for second in the conference regular season standings, and received an at-large bid to the 1986 NCAA Tournament as No. 9 seed in the East region.

== Roster ==
1985–86 West Virginia Mountaineers men's basketball team
Players
Coaches

Pos.	#	Name	Height	Weight	Year	Hometown
G	4	Steve Berger	5 ft 11 in (1.8 m)	170 lb (77 kg)	Jr	Boomer, West Virginia
G	21	Dale Blaney	6 ft 4 in (1.93 m)	—	Sr
F	24	Darryl Prue	6 ft 7 in (2.01 m)	225 lb (102 kg)	Fr	Washington, D.C.
G	32	Herbie Brooks	6 ft 2 in (1.88 m)	180 lb (82 kg)	Fr	Mullens, West Virginia
F/C	33	Wade Smith	6 ft 10 in (2.08 m)	210 lb (95 kg)	Fr	Saint John, U.S. Virgin Islands
C	42	Ray Foster	6 ft 10 in (2.08 m)	240 lb (109 kg)	Fr	Cleveland, Ohio

Head coach

- Gale Catlett

Assistant coach(es)

Legend

- (C) Team captain
- (S) Suspended
- (I) Ineligible
- (W) Walk-on
- Injured
- Current redshirt

== Schedule and results ==
Date time, TV	Rank^{#}	Opponent^{#}	Result	Record	Site city, state
Regular Season
Nov 22, 1985*		vs. No. 10 Auburn; Preseason National Invitational Tournament	W 75–58	1–0	Hartford Civic Center; Hartford, Connecticut
Nov 24, 1985*		vs. St. John's; Preseason National Invitational Tournament	L 58–65	1–1	Hartford Civic Center; Hartford, Connecticut
Nov 26, 1985*		IUP	W 75–54	2–1	WVU Coliseum; Morgantown, West Virginia
Dec 3, 1985*		at No. 19 Auburn	L 59–84	2–2	Beard–Eaves–Memorial Coliseum; Auburn, Alabama
Dec 7, 1985*		at Marshall	L 60–64	2–3	
Dec 9, 1985*		Saint Joseph's	W 72–45	3–3	WVU Coliseum; Morgantown, West Virginia
Dec 11, 1985*		Maryland	L 41–42	3–4	WVU Coliseum; Morgantown, West Virginia
Dec 14, 1985*		Pittsburgh	W 74–63	4–4	WVU Coliseum; Morgantown, West Virginia
Dec 21, 1985*		at No. 20 Virginia Tech	L 69–76	4–5	Cassell Coliseum; Blacksburg, Virginia
Atlantic-10 Tournament
Feb 27, 1986*		Rutgers; Quarterfinals	W 64–58	21–9	WVU Coliseum; Morgantown, West Virginia
Mar 1, 1986*		vs. Temple; Semifinals	W 61–56	22–9	Brendan Byrne Arena; East Rutherford, New Jersey
Mar 3, 1986*		vs. Saint Joseph's; Championship game	L 64–72	22–10	Brendan Byrne Arena; East Rutherford, New Jersey
NCAA Tournament
Mar 13, 1986*	(9 E)	vs. (8 E) Old Dominion; First Round	L 64–72	22–11	Greensboro Coliseum; Greensboro, North Carolina
*Non-conference game. ^{#}Rankings from AP Poll. (#) Tournament seedings in parentheses. E=East. All times are in Eastern.
