= Bob Weinhauer =

American basketball coach and executive (born 1939)

Biographical details
- Born: May 23, 1939 (age 87); New York City, New York, U.S.

Playing career

Baseball
- c. 1960: Cortland
- Position: Catcher

Coaching career (HC unless noted)

Basketball
- 1973–1977: Penn (assistant)
- 1977–1982: Penn
- 1982–1985: Arizona State
- 1985–1986: Detroit Spirits
- 1988–1990: Philadelphia 76ers (assistant)
- 1991–1993: Atlanta Hawks (assistant)
- 1993–1994: Minnesota Timberwolves (assistant)
- 1996–1997: Milwaukee Bucks (assistant)

Administrative career (AD unless noted)
- 1987–1988: Philadelphia 76ers (scout)
- 1990–1991: Philadelphia 76ers (assistant GM)
- 1994–1996: Houston Rockets (GM)
- 1997–1999: Milwaukee Bucks (GM)

Head coaching record
- Overall: 143–90 (college); 24–24 (CBA)
- Tournaments: 6–4 (NCAA Division I); 1–2 (NIT)

Accomplishments and honors

Championships
- As head coach: NCAA Division I Regional—Final Four (1979); 5 Ivy League regular season (1978–1982); As executive: 2 NBA (1994, 1995)

Robert Weinhauer (born May 23, 1939) is an American former basketball coach and executive.

== Early life ==
Weinhauer was born in South Farmingdale, New York. His baseball talent at Massapequa High saw him go to the State University of New York at Cortland. He played catcher for three seasons, batting .330 while already having an interest for coaching. He graduated in 1961 with a bachelor's degree in physical education. He was inducted into the C-Club Hall of Fame in 1995. Weinhauer coached football, basketball, and baseball at Massapequa High School in Massapequa, New York.

== Coaching career ==
In 1973, Weinhauer was hired at University of Pennsylvania as an assistant on the staff to head coach Chuck Daly. Four years later, he was promoted to head coach when Daly left to become an assistant with the Philadelphia 76ers. He would serve as the head basketball coach for the next five seasons, in which they would win the Ivy League each time. The team went 61–9 in conference play and went 35-0 when playing at the Palestra. In 1979, the Penn Quakers made it all the way to the Final Four of the 1979 NCAA Division I basketball tournament. It is currently the last time an Ivy League school had made the Final Four. In 2012, he was inducted into the Penn Athletics Hall of Fame.

He left Penn for Arizona State University after the 1981–82 season. In 1983, the school was cited for irregularities in recruiting that saw them forfeit a scholarship. Weinhauer received a personal reprimand from the university for allowing an ineligible player to practice with the team. The Sun Devils never made it to the NCAA Tournament under the tenure of Weinhauer. On July 9, 1985, Arizona State fired him. In total, he compiled a career college basketball record of 143–90.

Weinhauer served as the head coach for the Detroit Spirits of the Continental Basketball Association (CBA) from 1985 to 1986 before moving to the National Basketball Association where he worked as an assistant coach, scout, and executive.

On April 29, 1994 (the first day of the 1994 NBA playoffs), he was hired by the Houston Rockets to be vice president of operations. He served as the general manager for the Houston Rockets from 1994 to 1996. It was Weimhauer who served as general mamager of the Rockets in their two runs to the NBA Finals, which included a 1995 trade on Valentine's Day of Otis Thorpe, the righta to Marcelo Nicola (drafted in 1993 but never played a game in the NBA) and a 1995 1st round draft pick to the Portland Trail Blazers for Clyde Drexler (who had wanted a trade) and Tracy Murray. A trade made by Weinhauer on February 23 spurred an unofficial rule. During the halftime warmup session, Weinhauer went over to Scott Brooks and told him that he was traded to the Dallas Mavericks (the trade was for Morlon Wiley and a second-round pick). The following year, the NBA moved the trade deadline up from 9:00 pm to 6:00 pm before later moving it to 3:00pm by 2003.

On August 30, 1996, He left the Rockets to be an assistant on the coaching staff of Chris Ford with the Milwaukee Bucks. In June 1997, he replaced Mike Dunleavy as general manager of the Bucks. In the 1998–99 season, under first-year hire George Karl as coach, the Bucks made the playoffs for the first time in eight years. However, a perception that they failed to make a move in free agency to help the roster led to Weinhauer (who had an expiring contract) being fired on August 11, 1999.

== Head coaching record ==
=== College ===
Record table
Season	Team	Overall	Conference	Standing	Postseason
Penn Quakers (Ivy League) (1977–1982)
1977–78	Penn	20–8	12–2	1st	NCAA Division I Regional semifinal
1978–79	Penn	25–7	13–1	1st	NCAA Division I Final Four
1979–80	Penn	17–12	11–3	T–1st	NCAA Division I second round
1980–81	Penn	20–8	13–1	T–1st	NIT first round
1981–82	Penn	17–10	12–2	1st	NCAA Division I first round
Penn:		99–45	61–9		
Arizona State Sun Devils (Pacific-10 Conference) (1982–1985)
1982–83	Arizona State	19–14	12–6	4th	NIT second round
1983–84	Arizona State	13–15	8–10	6th	
1984–85	Arizona State	12–16	7–11	7th	
Arizona State:		44–45	27–27		
Total:		143–90			
National champion Postseason invitational champion Conference regular season champion Conference regular season and conference tournament champion Division regular season champion Division regular season and conference tournament champion Conference tournament champion

== See also ==
- List of NCAA Division I Men's Final Four appearances by coach
