= 1985–86 Temple Owls men's basketball team =

American college basketball season

1985–86 Temple Owls men's basketball

NCAA tournament, second round
- Conference: Atlantic 10 Conference
- Record: 25–6 (15–3 A–10)
- Head coach: John Chaney (4th season)
- Home arena: McGonigle Hall

1985–86 Atlantic 10 men's basketball standings
	Conf.				Overall
Team	W		L	PCT	W		L	PCT
Saint Joseph's†	16	–	2	.889	26	–	6	.813
West Virginia	15	–	3	.833	22	–	11	.667
Temple	15	–	3	.833	25	–	6	.806
St. Bonaventure	10	–	8	.556	15	–	13	.536
Duquesne	9	–	9	.500	15	–	14	.517
George Washington	7	–	11	.389	12	–	16	.429
UMass	6	–	12	.333	9	–	9	.500
Rhode Island	5	–	13	.278	9	–	19	.321
Penn State	5	–	13	.278	12	–	17	.414
Rutgers	2	–	16	.111	8	–	21	.276
† 1986 Atlantic 10 Tournament winner Rankings from AP Poll

The 1985–86 Temple Owls men's basketball team represented Temple University as a member of the Atlantic 10 Conference during the 1985–86 NCAA Division I men's basketball season. Led by fourth-year head coach John Chaney, the Owls played their home games at McGonigle Hall in Philadelphia, Pennsylvania. Temple finished tied for second place in the A-10 regular season standings, then lost in the quarterfinals of the A-10 tournament. The Owls received an at-large bid to the NCAA tournament. As No. 9 seed in the Midwest region, the Owls defeated Jacksonville in the opening round before falling to No. 1 seed and eventual Final Four participant Kansas, 65–43. The team finished with a record of 25–6 (15–3 A-10).

== Roster ==
1985–86 Temple Owls men's basketball team
Players
Coaches

Pos.	#	Name	Height	Weight	Year	Previous school	Hometown
G	3	Nate Blackwell	6 ft 4 in (1.93 m)	170 lb (77 kg)	Jr	South Philadelphia HS	Philadelphia, PA
G	21	Howard Evans	6 ft 1 in (1.85 m)	—	So
F	32	Mike Vreeswyk	6 ft 7 in (2.01 m)	220 lb (100 kg)	Fr	Morrisville HS
F	33	Tim Perry	6 ft 9 in (2.06 m)	201 lb (91 kg)	So	Freehold HS	Freehold, NJ
C	44	Ramón Rivas	6 ft 10 in (2.08 m)	250 lb (113 kg)	So	Pedro Albizu Campos	Carolina, PR
F		Derrick Brantley	6 ft 7 in (2.01 m)	—	So
G		Ed Coe	6 ft 3 in (1.91 m)	—	Sr
G		Jerome Dowdell	6 ft 3 in (1.91 m)	—	Fr
F		Darrin Pearsall	6 ft 7 in (2.01 m)	—

Head coach

- John Chaney

Assistant coach(es)

Legend

- (C) Team captain
- (S) Suspended
- (I) Ineligible
- (W) Walk-on
- Injured
- Current redshirt

Roster

== Schedule ==
Date time, TV	Rank^{#}	Opponent^{#}	Result	Record	Site city, state
Regular season
Nov 26, 1985*		at Drexel	W 64–51	1–0	Daskalakis Athletic Center; Philadelphia, Pennsylvania
Nov 30, 1985*		at UCLA	L 59–75	1–1	Pauley Pavilion; Los Angeles, California
Dec 7, 1985*		at Wichita State	W 62–60	4–1	Levitt Arena; Wichita, Kansas
Dec 14, 1985*		vs. Villanova	W 81–73	5–1	The Palestra; Philadelphia, Pennsylvania
Dec 21, 1985*		Wake Forest	W 64–59	6–1	McGonigle Hall; Philadelphia, Pennsylvania
Jan 4, 1986		Rhode Island	W 76–60	9–1 (1–0)	McGonigle Hall; Philadelphia, Pennsylvania
Jan 9, 1986		vs. Saint Joseph's	L 71–80	9–2 (1–1)	The Palestra
Jan 11, 1986		Rutgers	W 68–59	10–2 (2–1)	McGonigle Hall; Philadelphia, Pennsylvania
Jan 16, 1986		at Duquesne	W 54–53	11–2 (3–1)	Civic Arena; Pittsburgh, Pennsylvania
Jan 18, 1986		at West Virginia	L 65–69 ^{OT}	11–3 (3–2)	WVU Coliseum; Morgantown, West Virginia
Feb 26, 1986		George Washington	W 73–54	24–4 (15–3)	McGonigle Hall; Philadelphia, Pennsylvania
Atlantic 10 Tournament
Mar 1, 1986*		vs. West Virginia	L 56–61	24–5	Brendan Byrne Arena; East Rutherford, New Jersey
NCAA Tournament
Mar 13, 1986*	(9 MW)	vs. (8 MW) Jacksonville; First Round	W 61–50 ^{OT}	25–5	University of Dayton Arena; Dayton, Ohio
Mar 15, 1986*	(9 MW)	vs. (1 MW) No. 2 Kansas; Second Round	L 43–65	25–6	University of Dayton Arena; Dayton, Ohio
*Non-conference game. ^{#}Rankings from AP poll. (#) Tournament seedings in parentheses. MW=Midwest. All times are in Eastern Standard Time.
