= 1985–86 Saint Joseph's Hawks men's basketball team =

American college basketball season

1985–86 Saint Joseph's Hawks men's basketball

Atlantic 10 Regular Season champions Atlantic 10 tournament champions Far West Classic Champions

NCAA tournament, second round
- Conference: Atlantic 10
- Record: 26–6 (16–2 Atlantic 10)
- Head coach: Jim Boyle (5th season)
- Home arena: Alumni Memorial Fieldhouse

1985–86 Atlantic 10 men's basketball standings
	Conf.				Overall
Team	W		L	PCT	W		L	PCT
Saint Joseph's†	16	–	2	.889	26	–	6	.813
West Virginia	15	–	3	.833	22	–	11	.667
Temple	15	–	3	.833	25	–	6	.806
St. Bonaventure	10	–	8	.556	15	–	13	.536
Duquesne	9	–	9	.500	15	–	14	.517
George Washington	7	–	11	.389	12	–	16	.429
UMass	6	–	12	.333	9	–	9	.500
Rhode Island	5	–	13	.278	9	–	19	.321
Penn State	5	–	13	.278	12	–	17	.414
Rutgers	2	–	16	.111	8	–	21	.276
† 1986 Atlantic 10 Tournament winner Rankings from AP Poll

The 1985–86 Saint Joseph's Hawks men's basketball team represented Saint Joseph's University as a member of the Atlantic-10 Conference during the 1985–86 NCAA Division I men's basketball season. Led by 2nd year head coach Jim Boyle, the Hawks finished with an overall record of 26–6 (16–2 in A-10 play). Saint Joseph's won both regular season and A-10 Tournament titles, and received an automatic bid to the NCAA tournament as No. 6 seed in the East Regional. The team defeated Richmond before losing to No. 14 seed Cleveland State in the second round.

== Roster ==
1985–86 Saint Joseph's Hawks men's basketball team
Players
Coaches

Pos.	#	Name	Height	Weight	Year	Previous school	Hometown
G/F	11	Maurice Martin	6 ft 6 in (1.98 m)	195 lb (88 kg)	Sr	Liberty HS	Liberty, New York
G	14	Bruiser Flint	—	—	Jr		Philadelphia, Pennsylvania

Head coach

- Jim Boyle

Assistant coach(es)

Legend

- (C) Team captain
- (S) Suspended
- (I) Ineligible
- (W) Walk-on
- Injured
- Current redshirt

== Schedule and results ==
Date time, TV	Rank^{#}	Opponent^{#}	Result	Record	Site city, state
Regular season
Dec 5, 1985*		at Siena	L 53–69	0–1	Alumni Recreation Center; Loudonville, New York
Dec 7, 1985*		at Fairfield	W 72–59	1–1	Alumni Hall; Fairfield, Connecticut
Dec 21, 1985*		vs. Villanova	W 63–61	2–2	Palestra; Philadelphia, Pennsylvania
Dec 27, 1985*		vs. Kansas State; Far West Classic	W 65–63	3–2	Memorial Coliseum; Portland, Oregon
Dec 28, 1985*		vs. Oregon State; Far West Classic	W 64–46	4–2	Memorial Coliseum; Portland, Oregon
Dec 29, 1985*		vs. Iowa; Far West Classic	W 60–56	5–2	Memorial Coliseum; Portland, Oregon
Jan 13, 1986*		No. 3 Duke	L 66–87	9–3	Palestra; Philadelphia, Pennsylvania
A-10 Tournament
Feb 27, 1986*		Penn State	W 59–51	23–5	Hagan Arena
Mar 1, 1986*		vs. Duquesne	W 60–59	24–5	Brendan Byrne Arena
Mar 3, 1986*		vs. West Virginia	W 72–64	25–5	Brendan Byrne Arena
NCAA Tournament
Mar 14, 1986*	(6 E)	vs. (11 E) Richmond; First Round	W 60–59	26–5	Carrier Dome; Syracuse, New York
Mar 16, 1986*	(6 E)	vs. (14 E) Cleveland State; Second Round	L 69–75	26–6	Carrier Dome; Syracuse, New York
*Non-conference game. ^{#}Rankings from AP poll. (#) Tournament seedings in parentheses. SE=Southeast.
