= 1986 Atlantic 10 men's basketball tournament =

- Classification: Division I
- Season: 1985–86
- Teams: 10
- Site: Rutgers Athletic Center; Piscataway, New Jersey
- Champions: Saint Joseph's University (1st title)
- Winning coach: Jim Boyle (1st title)
- MVP: Greg Mullee (Saint Joseph's)

1985–86 Atlantic 10 men's basketball standings
	Conf.				Overall
Team	W		L	PCT	W		L	PCT
Saint Joseph's†	16	–	2	.889	26	–	6	.813
West Virginia	15	–	3	.833	22	–	11	.667
Temple	15	–	3	.833	25	–	6	.806
St. Bonaventure	10	–	8	.556	15	–	13	.536
Duquesne	9	–	9	.500	15	–	14	.517
George Washington	7	–	11	.389	12	–	16	.429
UMass	6	–	12	.333	9	–	9	.500
Rhode Island	5	–	13	.278	9	–	19	.321
Penn State	5	–	13	.278	12	–	17	.414
Rutgers	2	–	16	.111	8	–	21	.276
† 1986 Atlantic 10 Tournament winner Rankings from AP Poll

The 1986 Atlantic 10 men's basketball tournament was played from February 25 to March 3, 1986. The tournament was played at the Brendan Bryne Arena in East Rutherford, NJ. The winner was named champion of the Atlantic 10 Conference and received an automatic bid to the 1986 NCAA Men's Division I Basketball Tournament.

Saint Joseph's University won the tournament. Greg Mullee of Saint Joseph's was named the tournament's Most Outstanding Player. Saint Joseph's, Temple, and West Virginia earned bids to the NCAA Tournament in 1986.

== Bracket ==
First round
8	Rhode Island	47
9	Penn State	50
7	Massachusetts	47
10	Rutgers	52

Quarterfinals
1	Saint Joseph's	59
9	Penn State	51
4	St. Bonaventure	67
5	Duquesne	71
2	West Virginia	88
10	Rutgers	60
3	Temple	73
6	George Washington	54

Semi-Finals
1	Saint Joseph's	60
5	Duquesne	59
2	West Virginia	61
3	Temple	56

Finals
1	Saint Joseph's	72
2	West Virginia	64
