= 1981–82 Temple Owls men's basketball team =

American college basketball season

1981–82 Temple Owls men's basketball

NIT, First Round
- Conference: East Coast Conference
- Record: 19–8 (11–0 ECC)
- Head coach: Don Casey (9th season)
- Home arena: McGonigle Hall

1981–82 ECC men's basketball standings
	Conf.				Overall
Team	W		L	PCT	W		L	PCT
East
Temple	11	–	0	1.000	19	–	8	.704
Saint Joseph's †	10	–	1	.909	25	–	5	.833
American	8	–	3	.727	21	–	9	.700
La Salle	7	–	4	.636	16	–	13	.552
Drexel	7	–	4	.636	19	–	11	.633
Hofstra	4	–	7	.364	12	–	16	.429
West
West Chester	8	–	8	.500	13	–	14	.481
Rider	7	–	9	.438	11	–	16	.407
Lafayette	7	–	9	.438	12	–	15	.444
Delaware	6	–	10	.375	9	–	17	.346
Bucknell	3	–	13	.188	7	–	20	.259
Lehigh	3	–	13	.188	9	–	17	.346
† 1982 ECC tournament winner Rankings from AP poll

The 1981–82 Temple Owls men's basketball team represented Temple University as a member of the East Coast Conference during the 1981–82 NCAA Division I men's basketball season.

== Roster ==
1981–82 Temple Owls men's basketball team
Players	Coaches
Pos. / # / Name / Height / Weight / Year / Hometown; G / 43 / Terence Stansbury / 6 ft 5 in (1.96 m) / 170 lb (77 kg) / So / Newark, Delaware	Head coach: Don Casey; Assistant coach(es) Legend: (C) Team captain; (S) Suspended; (I) Ineligible; (W) Walk-on; Injured; Current redshirt

== Schedule ==
Date time, TV	Rank^{#}	Opponent^{#}	Result	Record	Site city, state
Regular Season
Nov 28, 1981		West Chester	W 65–53	1–0 (1–0)	McGonigle Hall; Philadelphia, Pennsylvania
Dec 1, 1981*		Utica	W 60–43	2–0 (1–0)	McGonigle Hall; Philadelphia, Pennsylvania
Dec 3, 1981		at Lehigh	W 60–43	3–0 (2–0)	Stabler Arena; Bethlehem, Pennsylvania
Dec 5, 1981*		Fordham	W 64–63	4–0 (2–0)	McGonigle Hall; Philadelphia, Pennsylvania
Dec 9, 1981*		South Carolina	W 54–51	5–0 (2–0)	McGonigle Hall; Philadelphia, Pennsylvania
Dec 12, 1981		Rider	W 88–72	6–0 (3–0)	McGonigle Hall; Philadelphia, Pennsylvania
Dec 19, 1981*		vs. Villanova	W 52–48	7–0 (3–0)	Palestra; Philadelphia, Pennsylvania
Dec 23, 1981*		at St. John's	L 61–68	7–1 (3–0)	Alumni Hall; Queens, NY
Dec 29, 1981*		vs. Florida	W 85–81	8–1 (3–0)	
Dec 29, 1981*		at San Diego State	L 64–75	8–2 (3–0)	San Diego Sports Arena; San Diego, California
Jan 4, 1982*		Pittsburgh	L 59–60	8–3 (3–0)	McGonigle Hall; Philadelphia, Pennsylvania
Jan 6, 1982		at Bucknell	W 80–54	9–3 (4–0)	Davis Gym; Lewisburg, Pennsylvania
Jan 9, 1982*		Navy	W 80–64	10–3 (4–0)	McGonigle Hall; Philadelphia, Pennsylvania
Jan 13, 1982		Delaware	W 73–49	11–3 (5–0)	McGonigle Hall; Philadelphia, Pennsylvania
Jan 16, 1982		at Hofstra	W 61–58	12–3 (6–0)	Physical Fitness Center; Hempstead, NY
Jan 19, 1982*		at Marist	W 61–58	13–3 (6–0)	McCann Field House; Poughkeepsie, NY
Jan 23, 1982		vs. Saint Joseph's	W 82–77	14–3 (7–0)	
Jan 27, 1982*		at Penn State	L 50–53	14–4 (7–0)	Rec Hall; University Park, Pennsylvania
Feb 3, 1982*		vs. Maine	W 77–57	15–4 (7–0)	
Feb 6, 1982		at Drexel	W 64–44	16–4 (8–0)	Daskalakis Athletic Center; Philadelphia, Pennsylvania
Feb 9, 1982*		vs. Penn	L 56–59	16–5 (8–0)	
Feb 13, 1982*		at William & Mary	L 59–68	16–6 (8–0)	William & Mary Hall
Feb 16, 1982		Lafayette	W 76–66	17–6 (9–0)	McGonigle Hall; Philadelphia, Pennsylvania
Feb 20, 1982		vs. La Salle	W 86–72	18–6 (10–0)	
Feb 26, 1982		at American	W 67–62	19–6 (11–0)	Fort Myer Ceremonial Hall
ECC Tournament
Mar 6, 1982	(1)	(9) Drexel; Quarterfinals	L 55–61	19–7 (11–0)	McGonigle Hall (1,600); Philadelphia, Pennsylvania
NIT Tournament
Mar 12, 1982*		at Georgia; First Round	L 60–73	19–8 (11–0)	Stegeman Coliseum; Athens, Georgia
*Non-conference game. ^{#}Rankings from AP Poll. (#) Tournament seedings in parentheses. All times are in Eastern Standard Time.
