= 1981–82 Yale Bulldogs men's basketball team =

American college basketball season

1981–82 Yale Bulldogs men's basketball
- Conference: Ivy League
- Record: 13–13 (7–7 Ivy)
- Head coach: Ray Carazo (7th season)
- Home arena: John J. Lee Amphitheater

The 1981–82 Yale Bulldogs men's basketball team represented Yale University during the 1981–82 men's college basketball season. The Bulldogs, led by 6th year head coach Ray Carazo, played their home games at John J. Lee Amphitheater of the Payne Whitney Gymnasium and were members of the Ivy League. They finished the season 13–13, 7–7 in Ivy League play to finish in fourth place.

== Schedule ==
Date time, TV	Rank^{#}	Opponent^{#}	Result	Record	Site city, state
November 28*		Holy Cross	W 68–62	1–0	Payne Whitney Gymnasium; New Haven, CT
December 5		at Brown	W 76–72	2–0 (1–0)	Marvel Gymnasium; Providence, RI
December 9*		at Colgate	L 57–70	2–1 (1–0)	Cotterell Court; Hamilton, NY
December 12*		Trinity	W 53–45	3–1 (1–0)	Payne Whitney Gymnasium; New Haven, CT
December 28*		at Toledo	L 68–90	3–2 (1–0)	John F. Savage Hall; Toledo, Ohio
December 29*		vs. Bowling Green State	W 82–78 ^{OT}	4–2 (1–0)	John F. Savage Hall; Toledo, Ohio
January 4*		Fordham	L 58–73	4–3 (1–0)	Payne Whitney Gymnasium; New Haven, CT
January 8		Princeton	L 47–59	4–4 (1–1)	Payne Whitney Gymnasium; New Haven, CT
January 9		Penn	W 49–48	5–4 (2–1)	Payne Whitney Gymnasium; New Haven, CT
January 12*		Army	W 68–63	6–4 (2–1)	Payne Whitney Gymnasium; New Haven, CT
January 16*		at New Hampshire	L 60–63	6–5 (2–1)	Lundholm Gymnasium; Durham, NH
January 19*		at Manhattan	L 65–74	6–6 (2–1)	Draddy Gymnasium the Bronx, NY
January 22*		Fairfield	W 71–62	7–6 (2–1)	Payne Whitney Gymnasium; New Haven, CT
January 26*		at Connecticut	L 57–63	7–7 (2–1)	Hartford Civic Center; Hartford, CT
January 30*		Clark	W 90–75	8–7 (2–1)	Payne Whitney Gymnasium; New Haven, CT
February 5		Dartmouth	W 84–65	9–7 (3–1)	Payne Whitney Gymnasium; New Haven, CT
February 6		Harvard	W 76–67	10–7 (4–1)	Payne Whitney Gymnasium; New Haven, CT
February 9		Brown	W 74–65	11–7 (5–1)	Payne Whitney Gymnasium; New Haven, CT
February 12		at Columbia	L 55–67	11–8 (5–2)	Levien Gymnasium; New York City
February 13		at Cornell	L 49–50	11–9 (5–3)	Barton Hall; Ithaca, NY
February 19		at Penn	L 62–81	11–10 (5–4)	The Palestra; Philadelphia, Pennsylvania
February 20		at Princeton	L 49–50	11–11 (5–5)	Jadwin Gymnasium; Princeton, NJ
February 26		Cornell	W 74–67	12–11 (6–5)	Payne Whitney Gymnasium; New Haven, CT
February 27		Columbia	L 57–64	12–12 (6–6)	Payne Whitney Gymnasium; New Haven, CT
March 5		at Harvard	W 84–81	13–12 (7–6)	Malkin Athletic Center; Cambridge, Massachusetts
March 6		at Dartmouth	L 85–88	13–13 (7–7)	Alumni Gymnasium; Hanover, NH
*Non-conference game. ^{#}Rankings from AP Poll. (#) Tournament seedings in parentheses.
