= 1978–79 NCAA Division I men's basketball season =

Basketball season

- Preseason AP No. 1: Duke Blue Devils
- NCAA Tournament: 1979
- Tournament dates: March 9 – 26, 1979
- National Championship: Special Events Center; Salt Lake City, Utah
- NCAA Champions: Michigan State Spartans
- Helms National Champions: Michigan State Spartans
- Other champions: Indiana Hoosiers (NIT)
- Player of the Year (Naismith, Wooden): Larry Bird, Indiana State Sycamores
- Player of the Year (Helms): Larry Bird, Indiana State Sycamores

The 1978–79 NCAA Division I men's basketball season began in November 1978, progressed through the regular season and conference tournaments, and concluded with the 1979 NCAA Division I men's basketball tournament championship game on March 26, 1979, at the Special Events Center in Salt Lake City, Utah. The Michigan State Spartans won their first NCAA national championship with a 75–64 victory over the Indiana State Sycamores.

== Season headlines ==
- The Trans America Athletic Conference began play, with eight original members. It was renamed the Atlantic Sun Conference in 2001.
- Indiana State senior forward Larry Bird and Michigan Spartans sophomore point guard Earvin "Magic" Johnson emerged as two highly popular and successful players during the season, and their rivalry — culminating in a meeting in the national championship game — captured national attention of basketball fans and the sports media during the year.
- In the Pacific 10 Conference, UCLA won an NCAA-record 13th consecutive conference title.
- The first Great Alaska Shootout took place. The long-running Shootout would become one of the premier early-season tournaments before it was discontinued after its 2017 edition.
- On February 24, North Carolina trailed Duke 7–0 at halftime. It was the first scoreless half for an NCAA basketball team since 1938.
- At Boston College, players took part in a point-shaving scheme which was revealed in 1980.
- The NCAA tournament expanded from 32 to 40 teams and used seeding to place all teams in its bracket for the first time.
- The first public lottery for tickets to the NCAA tournament Final Four was held. The championship game enjoyed the highest television rating in college basketball history.
- The National Invitation Tournament expanded from 16 to 24 teams.
- The growing fan appreciation and financial success of college basketball during the season prompted planning for the creation of the ESPN network and the original Big East Conference, both of which launched the following season and would push the sport to greater prominence in the years to come.

== Season outlook ==
=== Pre-season polls ===
The top 20 from the AP Poll during the pre-season.

'Associated Press'
Ranking	Team
1	Duke (38)
2	UCLA (8)
3	Notre Dame (1)
4	Louisville
5	Kansas (1)
6	Texas
7	Michigan State
8	Michigan
9	Syracuse
10	Indiana
11	Kentucky
12	NC State
13	USC
14	LSU
15	Rutgers
16	North Carolina
17	San Francisco
18	Marquette
19	Alabama
20	UNLV

UPI Coaches
Ranking	Team
1	Duke
2	UCLA
3	Notre Dame
4	Michigan State
5	Louisville
5	Kansas
7	Texas
8	Michigan
9	NC State
10	USC
11	Indiana
12	North Carolina
13	Syracuse
14	Kentucky
15	Alabama
16	San Francisco
17	LSU
18	Rutgers
19	Minnesota
20	Marquette

== Conference membership changes ==
The 1978–79 season was most notable for the expansion of the Pacific-8 Conference to 10 members with the addition of the men's athletic programs of Arizona and Arizona State (the conference did not sponsor women's sports until the 1986–87 school year). The conference duly renamed itself the Pacific-10 Conference.

School	Former conference	New conference
Arizona Wildcats	Western Athletic Conference	Pacific-10 Conference
Arizona State Sun Devils	Western Athletic Conference	Pacific-10 Conference
Arkansas-Little Rock Trojans	Arkansas Intercollegiate Conference (NAIA)	Division I independent
Baltimore Super Bees	Mason–Dixon (D-II)	Division I independent
Centenary Gentlemen	Division I independent	Trans America Athletic Conference
East Tennessee State Buccaneers	Ohio Valley Conference	Division I independent
George Mason Patriots	Mason–Dixon (D-II)	Division I independent
Georgia Tech Yellow Jackets	Metro Conference	Division I independent
Hardin–Simmons Cowboys	Division I independent	Trans America Athletic Conference
Houston Baptist Huskies	Division I independent	Trans America Athletic Conference
Mercer Bears	Division I independent	Trans America Athletic Conference
Northeast Louisiana Indians	Division I independent	Trans America Athletic Conference
Oklahoma City Chiefs	Division I independent	Trans America Athletic Conference
Pan American Broncs	Division I independent	Trans America Athletic Conference
Samford Bulldogs	Division I independent	Trans America Athletic Conference
San Diego State Aztecs	Pacific Coast Athletic Association	Western Athletic Conference
Virginia Tech Hokies	Division I independent	Metro Conference
UAB Blazers	No program	Division I independent
Utah State Aggies	Division I independent	Pacific Coast Athletic Association

== Regular season ==
=== Conferences ===
==== Conference winners and tournaments ====
Of 22 Division I basketball conferences, 13 determined their league champion with a single-elimination tournament, while seven leagues sent their regular-season champion to the NCAA Tournament. The Southwestern Athletic Conference (SWAC) did not receive an automatic tournament bid until the 1979–80 season, while the Trans America Athletic Conference (TAAC) received its automatic bid in 1980–81.

Conference	Regular season winner	Conference player of the year	Conference tournament	Tournament venue (City)	Tournament winner
Atlantic Coast Conference	Duke & North Carolina	Mike Gminski, Duke	1979 ACC men's basketball tournament	Greensboro Coliseum (Greensboro, North Carolina)	North Carolina
Big Eight Conference	Oklahoma	John McCullough, Oklahoma	1979 Big Eight Conference men's basketball tournament	Kemper Arena (Kansas City, Missouri) (Semifinals and Finals)	Oklahoma
Big Sky Conference	Weber State	Lawrence Butler, Idaho State	1979 Big Sky Conference men's basketball tournament	Dee Events Center (Ogden, Utah)	Weber State
Big Ten Conference	Michigan State, Purdue & Iowa	None Selected	No Tournament		
East Coast Conference	Temple (East); Bucknell (West)	Michael Brooks, La Salle	1979 East Coast Conference men's basketball tournament	The Palestra (Philadelphia)	Temple
Eastern Athletic Association (Eastern 8)	Villanova	James Bailey, Rutgers	1979 Eastern 8 men's basketball tournament	Civic Arena (Pittsburgh, Pennsylvania)	Rutgers
Eastern College Athletic; Conference (ECAC)	Division I ECAC members played as independents during the regular season (see note)	Nikos Galis, Seton Hall; Corny Thompson, Connecticut	1979 ECAC Metro Region tournament	Nassau Coliseum (Uniondale, New York)	Iona
Eastern College Athletic; Conference (ECAC)	Division I ECAC members played as independents during the regular season (see note)	Nikos Galis, Seton Hall; Corny Thompson, Connecticut	1979 ECAC New England Region tournament	Providence Civic Center (Providence, Rhode Island)	Connecticut
Eastern College Athletic; Conference (ECAC)	Division I ECAC members played as independents during the regular season (see note)	Nikos Galis, Seton Hall; Corny Thompson, Connecticut	1979 ECAC South-Upstate Region tournament	Cole Field House (College Park, Maryland)	Georgetown
Ivy League	Penn	Tony Price, Penn	No Tournament		
Metro Conference	Louisville	Pat Cummings, Cincinnati	1979 Metro Conference men's basketball tournament	Mid-South Coliseum (Memphis, Tennessee)	Virginia Tech
Mid-American Conference	Toledo	Paul Dawkins, Northern Illinois	No Tournament		
Missouri Valley Conference	Indiana State	Larry Bird, Indiana State	1979 Missouri Valley Conference men's basketball tournament	Hulman Center (Terre Haute, Indiana)	Indiana State
Ohio Valley Conference	Eastern Kentucky	James Tillman, Eastern Kentucky	1979 Ohio Valley Conference men's basketball tournament	McBrayer Arena (Richmond, Kentucky) (Semifinals and Finals)	Eastern Kentucky
Pacific-10 Conference	UCLA	David Greenwood, UCLA	No Tournament		
Pacific Coast Athletic Association	Pacific	Ron Cornelius, Pacific	1979 PCAA men's basketball tournament	Anaheim Convention Center (Anaheim, California)	Pacific
Southeastern Conference	LSU	Reggie King, Alabama	1979 SEC men's basketball tournament	Birmingham Jefferson Convention Complex (Birmingham, Alabama)	Tennessee
Southern Conference	Appalachian State	Jonathan Moore, Furman	1979 Southern Conference men's basketball tournament	Roanoke Civic Center (Roanoke, Virginia) (Semifinals and Finals)	Appalachian State
Southland Conference	Lamar	David Lawrence, McNeese State	No Tournament		
Southwest Conference	Texas & Arkansas	Sidney Moncrief, Arkansas (Consensus)	1979 Southwest Conference men's basketball tournament	The Summit (Houston, Texas)	Arkansas
Southwestern Athletic Conference	Alcorn State	Larry Smith, Alcorn State	1979 SWAC men's basketball tournament	Baton Rouge River Center; Baton Rouge, Louisiana	Alcorn State
Sun Belt Conference	South Alabama	Rory White, South Alabama	1979 Sun Belt Conference men's basketball tournament	Charlotte Coliseum (Charlotte, North Carolina) (Semifinals and Finals)	Jacksonville
Trans America Athletic Conference	Northeast Louisiana	Calvin Natt, Northeast Louisiana	1979 TAAC men's basketball tournament	Ewing Coliseum (Monroe, Louisiana)	Northeast Louisiana
West Coast Athletic Conference	San Francisco	Bill Cartwright, San Francisco	No Tournament		
Western Athletic Conference	BYU	None Selected	No Tournament		

NOTE: From 1975 to 1981, the Eastern College Athletic Conference (ECAC), a loosely organized sports federation of colleges and universities in the Northeastern United States, organized Division I ECAC regional tournaments for those of its members that were independents in basketball. Each 1979 tournament winner received an automatic bid to the 1979 NCAA Division I men's basketball tournament in the same way that the tournament champions of conventional athletic conferences did.

==== Conference standings ====
1978–79 ACC men's basketball standings
	Conf.				Overall
Team	W		L	PCT	W		L	PCT
No. 9 North Carolina †	9	–	3	.750	23	–	6	.793
No. 11 Duke	9	–	3	.750	22	–	8	.733
Virginia	7	–	5	.583	19	–	10	.655
Maryland	6	–	6	.500	19	–	11	.633
Clemson	5	–	7	.417	19	–	10	.655
NC State	3	–	9	.250	18	–	12	.600
Wake Forest	3	–	9	.250	12	–	15	.444
† 1979 ACC tournament winner Rankings from AP Poll

1978–79 Big Eight Conference men's basketball standings
	Conf.				Overall
Team	W		L	PCT	W		L	PCT
No. 16 Oklahoma †	10	–	4	.714	21	–	10	.677
Missouri	8	–	6	.571	13	–	15	.464
Kansas State	8	–	6	.571	16	–	12	.571
Kansas	8	–	6	.571	18	–	11	.621
Nebraska	7	–	7	.500	14	–	13	.519
Iowa State	6	–	8	.429	11	–	16	.407
Oklahoma State	5	–	9	.357	12	–	15	.444
Colorado	4	–	10	.286	14	–	13	.519
† 1979 Big Eight tournament winner Rankings from AP Poll

1978–79 Big Sky men's basketball standings
	Conf.				Overall
Team	W		L	PCT	W		L	PCT
Weber State †	10	–	4	.714	25	–	9	.735
Northern Arizona	8	–	6	.571	14	–	14	.500
Idaho State	8	–	6	.571	14	–	13	.519
Montana	7	–	7	.500	14	–	13	.519
Gonzaga	7	–	7	.500	16	–	10	.615
Montana State	6	–	8	.429	15	–	11	.577
Boise State	6	–	8	.429	11	–	15	.423
Idaho	4	–	10	.286	11	–	15	.423
† Big Sky Conference tournament winner

1978–79 Big Ten Conference men's basketball standings
	Conf.				Overall
Team	W		L	PCT	W		L	PCT
No. 3 Michigan State	13	–	5	.722	26	–	6	.813
No. 15 Purdue	13	–	5	.722	27	–	8	.771
No. 20 Iowa	13	–	5	.722	20	–	8	.714
Ohio State	12	–	6	.667	19	–	12	.613
Indiana	10	–	8	.556	22	–	12	.647
Michigan	8	–	10	.444	15	–	12	.556
Illinois	7	–	11	.389	19	–	11	.633
Wisconsin	6	–	12	.333	12	–	15	.444
Minnesota	6	–	12	.333	11	–	16	.407
Northwestern	2	–	16	.111	6	–	21	.222
Rankings from AP Poll

1978–79 ECC men's basketball standings
	Conf.				Overall
Team	W		L	PCT	W		L	PCT
East
Temple †	10	–	0	1.000	25	–	4	.862
Saint Joseph's	9	–	2	.818	19	–	11	.633
La Salle	9	–	2	.818	15	–	13	.536
American	7	–	4	.636	14	–	13	.519
Drexel	6	–	5	.545	18	–	9	.667
Hofstra	3	–	8	.273	8	–	19	.296
West
Bucknell	11	–	5	.688	18	–	9	.667
Lafayette	8	–	8	.500	16	–	12	.571
Rider	7	–	8	.467	11	–	15	.423
West Chester	4	–	12	.250	8	–	18	.308
Lehigh	4	–	12	.250	8	–	18	.308
Delaware	2	–	12	.143	5	–	22	.185
† 1979 ECC tournament winner Rankings from AP Poll

1978–79 Eastern 8 men's basketball standings
	Conf.				Overall
Team	W		L	PCT	W		L	PCT
Villanova	9	–	1	.900	13	–	13	.500
No. 18 Rutgers †	7	–	3	.700	22	–	9	.710
West Virginia	7	–	3	.700	16	–	12	.571
Pittsburgh	6	–	4	.600	18	–	11	.621
George Washington	5	–	5	.500	13	–	14	.481
Penn State	4	–	6	.400	12	–	18	.400
Duquesne	2	–	8	.200	13	–	13	.500
UMass	0	–	10	.000	5	–	22	.185
† 1979 Eastern 8 Tournament winner Rankings from AP Poll

1978–79 Ivy League men's basketball standings
	Conf.				Overall
Team	W		L	PCT	W		L	PCT
No. 14 Penn	13	–	1	.929	25	–	7	.781
Columbia	10	–	4	.714	17	–	9	.654
Princeton	7	–	7	.500	14	–	12	.538
Dartmouth	6	–	8	.429	14	–	12	.538
Brown	6	–	8	.429	8	–	18	.308
Harvard	6	–	8	.429	8	–	21	.276
Yale	5	–	9	.357	11	–	15	.423
Cornell	3	–	11	.214	8	–	18	.308
Rankings from AP Poll

1978–79 Metro Conference men's basketball standings
	Conf.				Overall
Team	W		L	PCT	W		L	PCT
No. 13 Louisville	9	–	1	.900	24	–	8	.750
Florida State	7	–	3	.700	19	–	10	.655
Memphis State	5	–	5	.500	13	–	15	.464
Virginia Tech †	4	–	6	.400	22	–	9	.710
Cincinnati	4	–	6	.400	13	–	14	.481
Saint Louis	3	–	7	.300	10	–	17	.370
Tulane	2	–	8	.200	8	–	19	.296
† 1979 Metro Conference tournament winner Rankings from AP Poll

1978–79 Mid-American Conference men's basketball standings
	Conf.				Overall
Team	W		L	PCT	W		L	PCT
No. 19 Toledo	13	–	3	.813	22	–	8	.733
Central Michigan	13	–	3	.813	19	–	9	.679
Ohio	10	–	6	.625	16	–	11	.593
Ball State	9	–	7	.563	16	–	11	.593
Northern Illinois	8	–	8	.500	14	–	13	.519
Kent State	7	–	9	.438	13	–	14	.481
Bowling Green State	6	–	10	.375	14	–	13	.519
Miami (Ohio)	6	–	10	.375	9	–	18	.333
Eastern Michigan	5	–	11	.313	9	–	18	.333
Western Michigan	3	–	13	.188	7	–	23	.233
Rankings from AP Poll

1978–79 Missouri Valley Conference men's basketball standings
	Conf.				Overall
Team	W		L	PCT	W		L	PCT
No. 1 Indiana State †	16	–	0	1.000	33	–	1	.971
New Mexico State	11	–	5	.688	22	–	10	.688
Wichita State	8	–	8	.500	14	–	14	.500
Creighton	8	–	8	.500	14	–	13	.519
Southern Illinois	8	–	8	.500	15	–	13	.536
Drake	8	–	8	.500	15	–	12	.556
Tulsa	7	–	9	.438	13	–	14	.481
West Texas State	3	–	13	.188	8	–	19	.296
Bradley	3	–	13	.188	9	–	17	.346
† 1979 MVC tournament winner Rankings from AP Poll

1978–79 Ohio Valley Conference men's basketball standings
	Conf.				Overall
Team	W		L	PCT	W		L	PCT
Eastern Kentucky †	9	–	3	.750	21	–	8	.724
Western Kentucky	7	–	5	.583	17	–	11	.607
Morehead State	7	–	5	.583	14	–	13	.519
Middle Tennessee	7	–	5	.583	16	–	11	.593
Tennessee Tech	7	–	5	.583	11	–	15	.423
Austin Peay State	3	–	9	.250	8	–	18	.308
Murray State	2	–	10	.167	4	–	22	.154
† 1979 OVC tournament winner Rankings from AP Poll

1978–79 Pacific-10 Conference men's basketball standings
	Conf.				Overall
Team	W		L	PCT	W		L	PCT
No. 2 UCLA	15	–	3	.833	25	–	5	.833
USC	14	–	4	.778	20	–	9	.690
Oregon State	11	–	7	.611	18	–	10	.643
Washington State	10	–	8	.556	18	–	9	.667
Arizona	10	–	8	.556	16	–	11	.593
Arizona State	7	–	11	.389	12	–	15	.444
Oregon	7	–	11	.389	12	–	15	.444
Stanford	6	–	12	.333	12	–	15	.444
Washington	6	–	12	.333	11	–	16	.407
California	4	–	14	.222	6	–	21	.222
Rankings from AP Poll

1978–79 Pacific Coast Athletic Association men's basketball standings
	Conf.				Overall
Team	W		L	PCT	W		L	PCT
Pacific †	11	–	3	.786	18	–	12	.600
Utah State	9	–	5	.643	19	–	11	.633
Fresno State	9	–	5	.643	16	–	12	.571
Cal State Fullerton	7	–	7	.500	16	–	11	.593
Long Beach State	7	–	7	.500	16	–	12	.571
UC Santa Barbara (Note: UC Santa Barbara was forced to vacated all wins during the 1978–79 season due to the use of ineligible players. UC Santa Barbara Record Book still includes win and loss totals.)	6	–	8	.429	12	–	15	.444
San Jose State	4	–	10	.286	7	–	20	.259
UC Irvine (Note: Two losses against UC Santa Barbara included in win count per UC Irvine Record Book.)	3	–	11	.214	9	–	19	.321
† 1979 PCAA tournament winner Rankings from AP Poll

1978–79 Southeastern Conference men's basketball standings
	Conf.				Overall
Team	W		L	PCT	W		L	PCT
No. 7 LSU	14	–	4	.778	23	–	6	.793
Tennessee †	12	–	6	.667	21	–	12	.636
Vanderbilt	11	–	7	.611	18	–	9	.667
Alabama	11	–	7	.611	22	–	11	.667
Mississippi State	11	–	7	.611	19	–	9	.679
Kentucky	10	–	8	.556	19	–	12	.613
Georgia	7	–	11	.389	14	–	14	.500
Ole Miss	6	–	12	.333	11	–	16	.407
Auburn	5	–	13	.278	13	–	16	.448
Florida	3	–	15	.167	8	–	19	.296
† 1979 SEC tournament winner Rankings from AP poll

1978–79 Southern Conference men's basketball standings
	Conf.				Overall
Team	W		L	PCT	W		L	PCT
Appalachian State †	11	–	3	.786	23	–	6	.793
Furman	9	–	3	.750	20	–	9	.690
The Citadel	10	–	4	.714	20	–	7	.741
Western Carolina	5	–	7	.417	14	–	14	.500
Marshall	5	–	8	.385	11	–	16	.407
Davidson	3	–	7	.300	8	–	19	.296
Chattanooga	3	–	8	.273	14	–	13	.519
VMI	2	–	8	.200	12	–	15	.444
† 1979 Southern Conference Tournament winner Rankings from AP poll

1978–79 Southland Conference men's basketball standings
	Conf.				Overall
Team	W		L	PCT	W		L	PCT
Lamar	9	–	1	.900	23	–	9	.719
Louisiana Tech	6	–	4	.600	17	–	8	.680
Southwestern Louisiana	6	–	4	.600	16	–	11	.593
Arkansas State	5	–	5	.500	15	–	12	.556
McNeese State	3	–	7	.300	10	–	17	.370
Texas-Arlington	1	–	9	.100	11	–	16	.407
Rankings from AP poll

1978–79 Southwest Conference men's basketball standings
	Conf.				Overall
Team	W		L	PCT	W		L	PCT
No. 5 Arkansas†	13	–	3	.813	25	–	5	.833
Texas	13	–	3	.813	21	–	8	.724
Texas A&M	11	–	5	.688	24	–	9	.727
Baylor	9	–	7	.563	16	–	12	.571
Texas Tech	9	–	7	.563	19	–	11	.633
Houston	6	–	10	.375	16	–	15	.516
SMU	6	–	10	.375	11	–	16	.407
Rice	4	–	12	.250	7	–	20	.259
TCU	1	–	15	.063	6	–	21	.222
† 1979 SWC tournament winner Rankings from AP Poll

1978–79 SWAC men's basketball standings
	Conf.				Overall
Team	W		L	PCT	W		L	PCT
Alcorn State †	12	–	0	1.000	28	–	1	.966
Grambling	6	–	6	.500	16	–	11	.593
Southern	6	–	6	.500	16	–	12	.571
Texas Southern	6	–	6	.500	13	–	14	.481
Jackson State	4	–	8	.333	13	–	14	.481
Mississippi Valley State		–		–	15	–	16	.484
Prairie View		–		–	17	–	14	.548
† 1979 SWAC tournament winner Rankings from AP Poll

1978–79 Sun Belt Conference men's basketball standings
	Conf.				Overall
Team	W		L	PCT	W		L	PCT
South Alabama	10	–	0	1.000	20	–	7	.741
South Florida	6	–	4	.600	14	–	14	.500
UNC Charlotte	6	–	4	.600	16	–	11	.593
Jacksonville †	5	–	5	.500	19	–	11	.633
New Orleans	3	–	7	.300	11	–	16	.407
Georgia State	0	–	10	.000	7	–	20	.259
† 1979 Sun Belt Conference tournament winner Rankings from AP Poll

1978–79 Trans America Athletic Conference men's basketball standings
	Conf.				Overall
Team	W		L	PCT	W		L	PCT
Northeast Louisiana†	2	–	0	1.000	30	–	4	.882
Mercer	2	–	0	1.000	21	–	6	.778
Oklahoma City	5	–	0	1.000	18	–	11	.621
Pan American	2	–	0	1.000	13	–	13	.500
Hardin–Simmons	2	–	5	.286	7	–	20	.259
Houston Baptist	1	–	4	.200	11	–	16	.407
Samford	0	–	2	.000	10	–	15	.400
Centenary	0	–	3	.000	9	–	20	.310
† 1979 TAAC tournament winner Rankings from AP poll

1978–79 West Coast Athletic Conference men's basketball standings
	Conf.				Overall
Team	W		L	PCT	W		L	PCT
No. 12 San Francisco	12	–	2	.857	22	–	7	.759
Pepperdine	10	–	4	.714	22	–	10	.688
Nevada	9	–	5	.643	21	–	7	.750
Seattle	8	–	6	.571	15	–	11	.577
Santa Clara	6	–	8	.429	13	–	14	.481
Portland	5	–	9	.357	18	–	10	.643
Saint Mary's	5	–	9	.357	13	–	15	.464
Loyola Marymount	1	–	13	.071	5	–	21	.192
Rankings from AP Poll

1978–79 WAC men's basketball standings
	Conf.				Overall
Team	W		L	PCT	W		L	PCT
BYU	10	–	2	.833	20	–	8	.714
Utah	9	–	3	.750	20	–	10	.667
New Mexico	8	–	4	.667	19	–	10	.655
Wyoming	5	–	7	.417	15	–	12	.556
San Diego State	4	–	8	.333	15	–	12	.556
UTEP	3	–	9	.250	11	–	15	.423
Colorado State	3	–	9	.250	11	–	16	.407
Rankings from AP Poll

=== Division I independents ===
A total of 74 college teams played as Division I independents. Among them, Syracuse (26–4) had the best winning percentage (.867) and Syracuse and DePaul (26–6) finished with the most wins.

1978–79 NCAA Division I men's basketball independents standings
	Conf.				Overall
Team	W		L	PCT	W		L	PCT
No. 8 Syracuse		–		–	26	–	4	.867
Georgetown		–		–	24	–	5	.828
No. 6 DePaul		–		–	26	–	6	.813
No. 4 Notre Dame		–		–	24	–	6	.800
VCU		–		–	20	–	5	.800
Iona		–		–	23	–	6	.793
Detroit		–		–	22	–	6	.786
Tennessee State		–		–	20	–	6	.769
Old Dominion		–		–	23	–	7	.767
No. 10 Marquette		–		–	22	–	7	.759
Wagner		–		–	21	–	7	.750
Connecticut		–		–	21	–	8	.724
UNLV		–		–	21	–	8	.724
UNC Wilmington		–		–	19	–	8	.704
Boston College		–		–	21	–	9	.700
James Madison		–		–	18	–	8	.692
Rhode Island		–		–	20	–	9	.690
George Mason		–		–	17	–	8	.680
St. Bonaventure		–		–	19	–	9	.679
Illinois State		–		–	20	–	10	.667
St. John's		–		–	21	–	11	.656
Dayton		–		–	19	–	10	.655
Boston University		–		–	17	–	9	.654
Fairfield		–		–	17	–	9	.654
Georgia Tech		–		–	17	–	9	.654
Oral Roberts		–		–	17	–	10	.630
Holy Cross		–		–	17	–	11	.607
Seton Hall		–		–	16	–	11	.593
Cleveland State		–		–	15	–	10	.600
East Tennessee State		–		–	16	–	11	.593
Maine		–		–	14	–	10	.583
UAB		–		–	15	–	11	.577
Army		–		–	14	–	11	.560
Denver		–		–	15	–	12	.556
South Carolina		–		–	15	–	12	.556
Stetson		–		–	15	–	12	.556
Siena		–		–	14	–	12	.538
St. Francis (NY)		–		–	14	–	12	.538
Navy		–		–	13	–	12	.520
Xavier		–		–	14	–	13	.519
Northeastern		–		–	13	–	13	.500
Saint Francis (PA)		–		–	13	–	13	.500
Robert Morris		–		–	13	–	14	.481
Southern Miss		–		–	13	–	14	.481
Air Force		–		–	12	–	13	.480
Long Island University		–		–	12	–	13	.480
Canisius		–		–	12	–	14	.462
Colgate		–		–	12	–	14	.462
Evansville		–		–	13	–	16	.448
East Carolina		–		–	12	–	15	.444
Loyola-Chicago		–		–	12	–	15	.444
Butler		–		–	11	–	16	.407
North Texas State		–		–	11	–	16	.407
Saint Peter's		–		–	10	–	15	.400
Campbell		–		–	10	–	16	.385
New Hampshire		–		–	10	–	16	.385
Providence		–		–	10	–	16	.385
Richmond		–		–	10	–	16	.385
Hawaii		–		–	10	–	17	.370
William & Mary		–		–	9	–	17	.346
Georgia Southern		–		–	9	–	18	.333
Fairleigh Dickinson		–		–	8	–	18	.308
Wisconsin-Milwaukee		–		–	8	–	18	.308
Vermont		–		–	8	–	18	.308
Northwestern State		–		–	7	–	19	.269
Fordham		–		–	7	–	22	.241
Catholic		–		–	6	–	20	.231
Arkansas-Little Rock		–		–	6	–	20	.231
Manhattan		–		–	6	–	20	.231
Niagara		–		–	6	–	20	.231
Portland State		–		–	6	–	21	.222
Baltimore		–		–	4	–	20	.167
Valparaiso		–		–	4	–	21	.160
Baptist		–		–	2	–	25	.074
Rankings from AP Poll

=== Informal championships ===
Conference	Regular season winner	Most Valuable Player
New Jersey-New York 7 Conference	Rutgers	None selected

Rutgers finished with a 7–0 regular-season record in head-to-head competition among members of the New Jersey-New York 7 Conference.

Conference	Regular season winner	Most Valuable Player
Philadelphia Big 5	Penn & Temple	Tony Price, Penn, & Rick Reed, Temple

Penn and Temple both finished with 3–1 records in head-to-head competition among the Philadelphia Big 5.

=== Statistical leaders ===
Points per game			Rebounds per game			Field goal percentage			Free throw percentage		
Player	School	PPG	Player	School	RPG	Player	School	FG%	Player	School	FT%
Lawrence Butler	Idaho St.	30.1	Monti Davis	Tenn. St.	16.2	Murray Brown	Florida St.	69.1	Darrell Mauldin	Campbell	92.1
Larry Bird	Indiana St.	28.6	Bill Cartwright	San Francisco	15.7	Jeff Ruland	Iona	67.1	Kurt Kanaskie	La Salle	91.7
Nick Galis	Seton Hall	27.5	Lionel Garrett	Southern	15.5	Steve Johnson	Oregon St.	66.1	Jim Krivacs	Texas	91.0
James Tillman	Eastern Kentucky	26.9	Larry Bird	Indiana St.	14.9	Jonathan Green	Tennessee St.	65.6	Tom Orner	Butler	90.9
Paul Dawkins	Northern Illinois	26.7	Larry Knight	Loyola-Illinois	14.3	Wiley Peck	Mississippi St.	64.4	Ron Perry	Holy Cross	90.8

== Post-season tournaments ==
=== NCAA tournament ===
==== Final Four ====
National semifinals
E9	Penn	67
ME2	Michigan State	101
MW1	Indiana State	76
W2	DePaul	74

National finals
ME2	Michigan State	75
MW1	Indiana State	64
Third place
E9	Penn	93
W2	DePaul	96^{OT}

=== National Invitation tournament ===
==== Semifinals & finals ====
Semifinals
Indiana	64
Ohio State	55
Purdue	87
Alabama	68

Finals
Indiana	53
Purdue	52
Third place
Ohio State	86
Alabama	96

== Awards ==
=== Consensus All-American teams ===
Consensus First Team
Player	Position	Class	Team
Larry Bird	F	Senior	Indiana State
Mike Gminski	C	Junior	Duke
David Greenwood	F	Senior	UCLA
Magic Johnson	G	Sophomore	Michigan State
Sidney Moncrief	G	Senior	Arkansas

Consensus Second Team
Player	Position	Class	Team
Bill Cartwright	C	Senior	San Francisco
Calvin Natt	C	Senior	Northeast Louisiana
Mike O'Koren	F	Junior	North Carolina
Jim Paxson	G/F	Senior	Dayton
Jim Spanarkel	G	Senior	Duke
Kelly Tripucka	F	Sophomore	Notre Dame
Sly Williams	F	Junior	Rhode Island

=== Major player of the year awards ===
- Wooden Award: Larry Bird, Indiana State
- Naismith Award: Larry Bird, Indiana State
- Helms Player of the Year: Larry Bird, Indiana State
- Associated Press Player of the Year: Larry Bird, Indiana State
- UPI Player of the Year: Larry Bird, Indiana State
- NABC Player of the Year: Larry Bird, Indiana State
- Oscar Robertson Trophy (USBWA): Larry Bird, Indiana State
- Adolph Rupp Trophy: Larry Bird, Indiana State
- Sporting News Player of the Year: Larry Bird, Indiana State

=== Major coach of the year awards ===
- Associated Press Coach of the Year: Bill Hodges, Indiana State
- Henry Iba Award (USBWA): Dean Smith, North Carolina
- NABC Coach of the Year: Ray Meyer, DePaul
- UPI Coach of the Year: Bill Hodges, Indiana State
- Sporting News Coach of the Year: Bill Hodges, Indiana State

=== Other major awards ===
- Frances Pomeroy Naismith Award (Best player under 6'0): Alton Byrd, Columbia
- Robert V. Geasey Trophy (Top player in Philadelphia Big 5): Tony Price, Penn & Rick Reed, Temple
- NIT/Haggerty Award (Top player in New York City metro area): Nick Galis, Seton Hall

== Coaching changes ==
A number of teams changed coaches during the season and after it ended.

Team	Former Coach	Interim Coach	New Coach	Reason
Arkansas-Little Rock	Happy Mahfouz		Ron Krestenbaum	
Austin Peay	Ed Thompson		Ron Bargatze	
Dartmouth	Gary Walters		Tim Cohane	Walters left for Providence.
Detroit	David Gaines		Willie McCarter	
East Carolina	Larry Gillman		Dave Odom	
Eastern Michigan	Ray Scott		Jim Boyce	
Florida A&M	Ajac Triplett		Josh Giles	
Hofstra	Roger Gaeckler		Joe Harrington	
La Salle	Paul Westhead		Lefty Ervin	Westhead left to become an assistant coach for the Los Angeles Lakers.
Louisiana Tech	J. D. Barnett		Andy Russo	
Loyola Marymount	Dave Benaderet		Ron Jacobs	
Marshall	Stu Aberdeen		Bob Zuffelato	Aberdeen died of a heart attack during the offseason, replaced by associate head coach Zuffelato.
Massachusetts	Jack Leaman		Ray Wilson	
Memphis State	Wayne Yates		Dana Kirk	
Middle Tennessee State	Jimmy Earle		Stan Simpson	
New Mexico	Norm Ellenberger	Charlie Harrison	Gary Colson	Ellenberger was fired following a recruiting scandal. Charlie Harrison served as interim coach for the 1979–80 season and Colson was hired as permanent coach in the 1980 offseason.
New Mexico State	Ken Hayes		Weldon Drew	
New Orleans	Butch van Breda Kolff		Don Smith	
North Carolina A&T	Gene Littles		Don Corbett	
Northeast Louisiana	Lenny Fant		Benny Hollis	Fant retired, turning the program to top assistant Hollis.
Oklahoma City	Paul Hansen		Ken Trickey	
Oklahoma State	Jim Killingsworth		Paul Hansen	
Oral Roberts	Lake Kelly		Ken Hayes	
Pacific	Stan Morrison		Dick Fichtner	Morrison left for USC
Pepperdine	Gary Colson		Jim Harrick	Colson resigned.
Providence	Dave Gavitt		Gary Walters	Gavitt left to concentrate on launching the new Big East Conference.
Robert Morris	Tom Weirich		Matt Furjanic	
St. Francis (NY)	Lucio Rossini		Gene Roberti	
Saint Mary's	Frank LaPorte		Bill Oates	
Saint Peter's	Bob Kelly		Bob Dukiet	
Samford	Fred Crowell		Cliff Wettig	
San Diego State	Tim Vezie		David Gaines	
San Jose State	Ivan Guevara		Bill Berry	San Jose State tapped Michigan State assistant Berry fresh off the Spartans' national championship.
Southern California	Bob Boyd		Stan Morrison	
Tennessee–Chattanooga	Ron Shumate		Murray Arnold	
Tennessee Tech	Cliff Malpass		Tom Deaton	
TCU	Tim Somerville		Jim Killingsworth	
UCLA	Gary Cunningham		Larry Brown	
Utah State	Dutch Belnap		Rod Tueller	
Vanderbilt	Wayne Dobbs		Richard Schmidt	
Virginia Commonwealth	Dana Kirk		J. D. Barnett	
Western Michigan	Dick Schiltz		Les Wothke	
Xavier	Tay Baker		Bob Staak	Xavier brought in Penn assistant Staak.
