= 1979 TAAC men's basketball tournament =

- Classification: Division I
- Season: 1978–79
- Teams: 6
- Site: Fant–Ewing Coliseum; Monroe, Louisiana
- Champions: Northeast Louisiana (1st title)
- Winning coach: Lenny Fant (1st title)
- MVP: Calvin Natt (Northeast Louisiana)
- TAAC men's basketball tournaments

1978–79 Trans America Athletic Conference men's basketball standings
	Conf.				Overall
Team	W		L	PCT	W		L	PCT
Northeast Louisiana†	2	–	0	1.000	30	–	4	.882
Mercer	2	–	0	1.000	21	–	6	.778
Oklahoma City	5	–	0	1.000	18	–	11	.621
Pan American	2	–	0	1.000	13	–	13	.500
Hardin–Simmons	2	–	5	.286	7	–	20	.259
Houston Baptist	1	–	4	.200	11	–	16	.407
Samford	0	–	2	.000	10	–	15	.400
Centenary	0	–	3	.000	9	–	20	.310
† 1979 TAAC tournament winner Rankings from AP poll

The 1979 Trans America Athletic Conference men's basketball tournament (now known as the ASUN men's basketball tournament) was held March 1–3 at the Fant–Ewing Coliseum in Monroe, Louisiana. This was the first edition of the tournament.

Northeast Louisiana defeated Mercer in the championship game, 90–69, to win their first TAAC/Atlantic Sun men's basketball tournament. The Indians, in turn, received a bid to the 1979 NIT.

Only six of the eight TAAC members participated in the inaugural tournament. However, this would be the only TAAC tournament for Oklahoma City, who subsequently joined the Midwestern City Conference for the 1979–80 season.

== Bracket ==
Quarterfinals; Thursday, March 1
Houston Baptist	68
Samford	66
Oklahoma City	90
Hardin–Simmons	86

Semifinals; Friday, March 2
Northeast Louisiana	89
Houston Baptist	62
Mercer	90
Oklahoma City	70

Championship; Saturday, March 3
Northeast Louisiana	90
Mercer	69
Third place Saturday, March 3
Houston Baptist	77
Oklahoma City	83
