= 1978–79 Indiana Hoosiers men's basketball team =

American college basketball season

1978–79 Indiana Hoosiers men's basketball

National Invitation Tournament, Champions
- Conference: Big Ten Conference
- Record: 22–12 (10–8 Big Ten)
- Head coach: Bobby Knight (8th season)
- Assistant coaches: Gerry Gimelstob; Jim Crews; Tom Miller
- Captain: Mike Woodson
- Home arena: Assembly Hall

1978–79 Big Ten Conference men's basketball standings
	Conf.				Overall
Team	W		L	PCT	W		L	PCT
No. 3 Michigan State	13	–	5	.722	26	–	6	.813
No. 15 Purdue	13	–	5	.722	27	–	8	.771
No. 20 Iowa	13	–	5	.722	20	–	8	.714
Ohio State	12	–	6	.667	19	–	12	.613
Indiana	10	–	8	.556	22	–	12	.647
Michigan	8	–	10	.444	15	–	12	.556
Illinois	7	–	11	.389	19	–	11	.633
Wisconsin	6	–	12	.333	12	–	15	.444
Minnesota	6	–	12	.333	11	–	16	.407
Northwestern	2	–	16	.111	6	–	21	.222
Rankings from AP Poll

The 1978–79 Indiana Hoosiers men's basketball team represented Indiana University. Their head coach was Bobby Knight, who was in his 8th year. The team played its home games in Assembly Hall in Bloomington, Indiana, and was a member of the Big Ten Conference.

The Hoosiers finished the regular season with an overall record of 22–12 and a conference record of 10–8, finishing 5th in the Big Ten Conference. Coming off an NCAA Tournament Sweet Sixteen appearance, Indiana missed out on an invitation to the 1979 NCAA Tournament. Instead, IU was invited to participate in the 1979 NIT, where Bobby Knight and the Hoosiers advanced to the championship game and won their first NIT title.

== Roster ==
No.	Name	Position	Ht.	Year	Hometown
20	Steve Reish	G	6–2	Fr.	Union City, Indiana
23	Don Cox	G/F	6–6	So.	Indianapolis, Indiana
24	Randy Wittman	G/F	6–6	Fr.	Indianapolis, Indiana
25	Tommy Baker	G	6–2	So.	Jeffersonville, Indiana
30	Ted Kitchel	F	6–8	Fr.	Galveston, Indiana
31	Scott Eells	F	6–9	Sr.	Hoopeston, Illinois
32	Landon Turner	F/C	6–10	Fr.	Indianapolis, Indiana
33	Eric Kirchner	F	6–7	So.	Edelstein, Illinois
34	Steve Risley	F	6–8	So.	Indianapolis, Indiana
40	Glen Grunwald	F	6–9	Jr.	Franklin Park, Illinois
41	Butch Carter	G	6–5	Jr.	Middletown, Ohio
42	Mike Woodson	F	6–5	Jr.	Indianapolis, Indiana
43	Jim Roberson	C	6–9	Sr.	Rochester, New York
44	Phil Isenbarger	F	6–8	So.	Muncie, Indiana
45	Ray Tolbert	F/C	6–9	So.	Anderson, Indiana

== Schedule/results ==
Date time, TV	Rank^{#}	Opponent^{#}	Result	Record	Site city, state
Regular season
11/24/1978*	No. 10	vs. Pepperdine; Sea Wolf Classic	L 58–59	0–1	Buckner Fieldhouse; Anchorage, AK
11/25/1978*	No. 10	vs. Texas A&M; Sea Wolf Classic	L 49–54	0–2	Buckner Fieldhouse; Anchorage, AK
11/26/1978*	No. 10	vs. Penn State; Sea Wolf Classic	W 86–65	1–2	Buckner Fieldhouse; Anchorage, AK
12/2/1978*	No. 20	Morehead State	W 80–37	2–2	Assembly Hall; Bloomington, Indiana
12/6/1978*		vs. No. 20 Georgetown	L 54–60	2–3	Capital Centre; Landover, Maryland
12/9/1978*		vs. Bradley	W 80–64	3–3	Market Square Arena; Indianapolis
12/16/1978*		No. 6 Kentucky; Indiana–Kentucky rivalry	W 68–67 ^{OT}	4–3	Assembly Hall; Bloomington, Indiana
12/18/1978*		Davidson; Indiana Classic	W 101–64	5–3	Assembly Hall; Bloomington, Indiana
12/19/1978*		Washington; Indiana Classic	W 73–56	6–3	Assembly Hall; Bloomington, Indiana
12/27/1978*		vs. Washington; Far West Classic Quarterfinals	W 71–57	7–3	Memorial Coliseum; Portland, Oregon
12/28/1978*		at Oregon; Far West Classic Semifinals	W 68–60	8–3	Memorial Coliseum; Portland, Oregon
12/30/1978*		vs. Michigan State; Far West Classic Championship	L 57–74	8–4	Memorial Coliseum; Portland, Oregon
1/4/1979		No. 4 Illinois; Rivalry	L 61–65	8–5 (0–1)	Assembly Hall; Bloomington, Indiana
1/6/1979		Purdue; Rivalry	W 63–54	9–5 (1–1)	Assembly Hall; Bloomington, Indiana
1/11/1979		at Minnesota	L 63–80	9–6 (1–2)	Williams Arena; Minneapolis
1/13/1979		at Iowa	L 61–90	9–7 (1–3)	Iowa Field House; Iowa City, Iowa
1/18/1979		at No. 6 Michigan State	L 58–82	9–8 (1–4)	Jenison Fieldhouse; East Lansing, Michigan
1/20/1979		Northwestern	W 74–45	10–8 (2–4)	Assembly Hall; Bloomington, Indiana
1/25/1979		Wisconsin	W 82–61	11–8 (3–4)	Assembly Hall; Bloomington, Indiana
1/27/1979		at No. 10 Ohio State	L 63–66 ^{OT}	11–9 (3–5)	St. John Arena; Columbus, Ohio
2/1/1979		Michigan	W 68–62	12–9 (4–5)	Assembly Hall; Bloomington, Indiana
2/3/1979		No. 7 Ohio State	W 70–62	13–9 (5–5)	Assembly Hall; Bloomington, Indiana
2/8/1979		at Northwestern	W 82–57	14–9 (6–5)	Welsh-Ryan Arena; Evanston, Illinois
2/10/1979		at Michigan	L 59–60	14–10 (6–6)	Crisler Arena; Ann Arbor, Michigan
2/15/1979		No. 8 Michigan State	L 47–59	14–11 (6–7)	Assembly Hall; Bloomington, Indiana
2/17/1979		at Wisconsin	W 68–62 ^{OT}	15–11 (7–7)	Wisconsin Field House; Madison, Wisconsin
2/22/1979		No. 12 Iowa	W 64–62	16–11 (8–7)	Assembly Hall; Bloomington, Indiana
2/24/1979		Minnesota	W 71–46	17–11 (9–7)	Assembly Hall; Bloomington, Indiana
3/1/1979		at No. 19 Purdue; Rivalry	L 48–55	17–12 (9–8)	Mackey Arena; West Lafayette, Indiana
3/3/1979		at Illinois; Rivalry	W 72–60	18–12 (10–8)	Assembly Hall; Champaign, Illinois
NIT
3/8/1979*		at Texas Tech; First Round	W 78–59	19–12 (10–8)	Lubbock Municipal Coliseum; Lubbock, Texas
3/12/1979*		Alcorn State; Second Round	W 73–69	20–12 (10–8)	Assembly Hall; Bloomington, Indiana
3/19/1979*		vs. Ohio State; Semifinals	W 64–55	21–12 (10–8)	Madison Square Garden; New York City
3/21/1979*		vs. No. 15 Purdue; Championship	W 53–52	22–12 (10–8)	Madison Square Garden; New York City
*Non-conference game. ^{#}Rankings from AP Poll. (#) Tournament seedings in parentheses.

== Notes ==
- During the NIT, Indiana and Ohio State received byes during the quarterfinals and advanced directly to the semifinals.

== Awards and honors ==
- Butch Carter, NIT co-Most Valuable Player
- Ray Tolbert, NIT co-Most Valuable Player
