= 1978–79 Purdue Boilermakers men's basketball team =

American college basketball season

1978–79 Purdue Boilermakers men's basketball

Big Ten Regular season champions (tie)

1979 National Invitation Tournament, Runner-up
- Conference: Big Ten Conference

Ranking
- Coaches: No. 14
- AP: No. 15
- Record: 27–8 (13–5 Big Ten)
- Head coach: Lee Rose (1st season)
- Assistant coaches: Everett Bass; Roger Blalock; George Faerber
- Home arena: Mackey Arena

1978–79 Big Ten Conference men's basketball standings
| | Conf. | | | | Overall |
| Team | W | | L | PCT | W | | L | PCT |
|---|---|---|---|---|---|---|---|---|
| No. 3 Michigan State | 13 | – | 5 | .722 | 26 | – | 6 | .813 |
| No. 15 Purdue | 13 | – | 5 | .722 | 27 | – | 8 | .771 |
| No. 20 Iowa | 13 | – | 5 | .722 | 20 | – | 8 | .714 |
| Ohio State | 12 | – | 6 | .667 | 19 | – | 12 | .613 |
| Indiana | 10 | – | 8 | .556 | 22 | – | 12 | .647 |
| Michigan | 8 | – | 10 | .444 | 15 | – | 12 | .556 |
| Illinois | 7 | – | 11 | .389 | 19 | – | 11 | .633 |
| Wisconsin | 6 | – | 12 | .333 | 12 | – | 15 | .444 |
| Minnesota | 6 | – | 12 | .333 | 11 | – | 16 | .407 |
| Northwestern | 2 | – | 16 | .111 | 6 | – | 21 | .222 |
Rankings from AP Poll

== Regular season ==
In head coach Lee Rose's first season at Purdue, where he introduced a slowed-down, tempo-controlled style of play, he led the Boilers to a Big Ten Conference co-title, along with Iowa and the eventual NCAA Champion, Ervin Johnson-led Michigan State. With only a 40 team NCAA Tournament field in 1979, the Boilermakers were forced to enter the NIT, instead, due to the favor Michigan State had over Purdue for their head-to-head record on the season. Purdue qualified for the National Invitation Tournament, where they lost to the Indiana Hoosiers in the tournament finals.

| Date time, TV | Rank^{#} | Opponent^{#} | Result | Record | Site (attendance) city, state |
|---|---|---|---|---|---|
| Nov 27, 1978* | | Indiana State | L 53–63 | 1–1 | Mackey Arena; West Lafayette, Indiana |
| Jan 13, 1979 | | No. 1 Michigan State | W 52–50 | 12–4 (2–2) | Mackey Arena; West Lafayette, Indiana |
| Jan 18, 1979* | | Iowa | L 46–56 | 12–5 (2–3) | Mackey Arena; West Lafayette, Indiana |
*Non-conference game. ^{#}Rankings from AP Poll. (#) Tournament seedings in parentheses. All times are in Eastern.

== National Invitation Tournament ==
- First Round
  - Purdue 97, Central Michigan 80
- Second Round
  - Purdue 84, Dayton 70
- Quarterfinal
  - Purdue 67, Old Dominion 59
- Semifinal
  - Purdue 87, Alabama 68
- Final
  - Indiana 53, Purdue 52

== Team players drafted into the NBA ==
| Round | Pick | Player | NBA club |
|---|---|---|---|
| 4 | 82 | Jerry Sichting | Golden State Warriors |
