= 1978–79 Michigan State Spartans men's basketball team =

American college basketball season

1978–79 Michigan State Spartans men's basketball

NCAA tournament National Champions Big Ten champions Far West Classic champions

National Championship Game, W 75–64 vs. Indiana State
- Conference: Big Ten Conference

Ranking
- Coaches: No. 4
- AP: No. 3
- Record: 26–6 (13–5 Big Ten)
- Head coach: Jud Heathcote (3rd season)
- Assistant coaches: Bill Berry; Fred Paulsen; Dave Harshman
- Captains: Earvin Johnson; Greg Kelser
- Home arena: Jenison Fieldhouse

1978–79 Big Ten Conference men's basketball standings
	Conf.				Overall
Team	W		L	PCT	W		L	PCT
No. 3 Michigan State	13	–	5	.722	26	–	6	.813
No. 15 Purdue	13	–	5	.722	27	–	8	.771
No. 20 Iowa	13	–	5	.722	20	–	8	.714
Ohio State	12	–	6	.667	19	–	12	.613
Indiana	10	–	8	.556	22	–	12	.647
Michigan	8	–	10	.444	15	–	12	.556
Illinois	7	–	11	.389	19	–	11	.633
Wisconsin	6	–	12	.333	12	–	15	.444
Minnesota	6	–	12	.333	11	–	16	.407
Northwestern	2	–	16	.111	6	–	21	.222
Rankings from AP Poll

The 1978–79 Michigan State Spartans men's basketball team represented Michigan State University in the 1978–79 NCAA Division I men's basketball season. The Spartans were coached by Jud Heathcote in his third year and played their home games at Jenison Field House in East Lansing, Michigan. They were members of the Big Ten Conference. The Spartans finished the season 26–6, 13–5 in Big Ten play to earn a share of the Big Ten championship. They received the conference's automatic bid to the NCAA tournament as the No. 2 seed in the Mideast region. They defeated Lamar, LSU, and No. 1-seeded Notre Dame to advance to the Final Four, only the school's second trip to the Final Four. They defeated Penn to advance to the national championship game where they defeated Indiana State to win the school's first national championship in basketball.

== Previous season ==
The Spartans finished the 1977–78 season 25–5, 15–3 in Big Ten play to win the Big Ten championship. They beat Providence in the first round of the NCAA tournament and Western Kentucky in the Mideast Regional semifinal. However, they lost to Kentucky in the Regional Final.

== Season summary ==
MSU was led by star sophomore, Earvin "Magic" Johnson (16.1 points, 7.4 rebounds, and 8.2 assists per game), senior Greg Kelser (18.1 points and 8.5 rebounds per game), and sophomore Jay Vincent (13.7 points and 5.6 rebounds per game). The Spartans started the season well, finishing the non-conference season with an 8–1 record including a loss to No. 13 ranked North Carolina. They entered conference play as the No. 1-ranked team in the country.

After winning their first two conference games, they lost four of their next six games to fall to a 4–4 record in the Big Ten, trailing first-place Ohio State by four games in the standings. However, Michigan State then won their next 10 games with wins over No. 7 Ohio State, at No. 15 Iowa, at No. 13 Ohio State, and No. 18 Purdue. A loss on the final day of the season to Wisconsin resulted in the Spartans slipping into a tie for the Big Ten championship with Iowa and Purdue. MSU received a bid to the NCAA tournament because of a better head-to-head performance against Big Ten rivals and a superior overall record (21–6). The Spartans finished the season ranked No. 3 in the country.

Michigan State advanced to the Final Four by defeating Lamar, LSU and No. 1-seeded Notre Dame. In the Final Four, the second Final Four appearance in school history, they faced Penn, blowing them out 101–67 to earn a trip to the Championship. There, the Spartans faced No. 1-ranked and undefeated Indiana State led by senior Larry Bird. In what was the most-watched college basketball game ever, Michigan State defeated Indiana State 75–64 to win the school's first ever basketball National Championship. Magic Johnson was voted Most Outstanding Player of the Final Four.

After two years in college, in which he averaged 17.1 points, 7.6 rebounds, and 7.9 assists per game, Johnson declared for the 1979 NBA draft.

== Roster and stats ==
1978–79 Michigan State Spartans men's basketball team
No	Name	Pos	Year	Height	Pts	Reb	Ast
32	Gregory Kelser	F	SR	6–7	18.1	8.5	1.5
33	Earvin Johnson	G	SO	6–8	16.1	7.4	8.2
31	Jay Vincent	C	SO	6–8	13.7	5.6	1.4
15	Ron Charles	F	JR	6–7	8.8	4.7	0.4
11	Terry Donnelly	G	JR	6–2	6.5	1.4	2.1
12	Mike Brkovich	F	SO	6–4	6.5	1.6	1.0
35	Rob Gonzalez	F	FR	6–7	1.5	0.8	1.0
25	Gerald Busby	F	FR	6–4	2.3	0.9	0.2
10	Greg Lloyd	G	FR	6–1	1.2	0.4	0.3
23	Mike Longaker	G	FR	6–1	1.3	0.5	0.0
42	Rich Kaye	F	SO	6–7	0.9	0.2	0.0
21	Don Brkovich	F	FR	6–6	0.3	0.2	0.0
43	Gerald Gilkie	F	SO	6–7	1.0	1.0	0.0
24	Jaime Hufffman	G	SO	6–3	0.3	0.5	0.0

== Schedule and results ==
Date time, TV	Rank^{#}	Opponent^{#}	Result	Record	Site city, state
Regular season
Nov 27, 1978*	No. 7	Central Michigan	W 71–54	1–0	Jenison Field House; East Lansing, Michigan
Dec. 9, 1978*	No. 4	Cal State Fullerton	W 92–89	2–0	Jenison Field House; East Lansing, Michigan
Dec 13, 1978*	No. 3	at Western Michigan	W 109–69	3–0	University Arena; Kalamazoo, Michigan
Dec 16, 1978*	No. 3	at No. 13 North Carolina	L 69–70	3–1	Carmichael Auditorium; Chapel Hill, North Carolina
Dec 19, 1978*	No. 3	Cincinnati	W 63–52	4–1	Pontiac Silverdome; Pontiac, Michigan
Dec 28, 1978*	No. 4	vs. Washington State; Far West Classic	W 98–52	5–1	Memorial Coliseum; Portland, Oregon
Dec 29, 1978*	No. 4	at Oregon State; Far West Classic championship	W 65–57	6–1	Memorial Coliseum; Portland, Oregon
Dec 30, 1978*	No. 4	vs. Indiana	W 74–57	7–1	Memorial Coliseum; Portland, Oregon
Jan 4, 1979	No. 1	Wisconsin	W 84–55	8–1 (1–0)	Jenison Field House; East Lansing, Michigan
Jan 6, 1979	No. 1	Minnesota	W 69–62	9–1 (2–0)	Jenison Field House; East Lansing, Michigan
Jan 11, 1979	No. 1	at No. 4 Illinois	L 55–57	9–2 (2–1)	Assembly Hall; Champaign, Illinois
Jan 13, 1979	No. 1	at Purdue	L 50–52	9–3 (2–2)	Mackey Arena; West Lafayette, Indiana
Jan 18, 1979	No. 6	Indiana	W 82–58	10–3 (3–2)	Jenison Field House; East Lansing, Michigan
Jan 20, 1979	No. 6	Iowa	W 83–72 ^{OT}	11–3 (4–2)	Jenison Field House; East Lansing, Michigan
Jan 25, 1979	No. 4	at Michigan; Rivalry	L 48–49	11–4 (4–3)	Crisler Arena; Ann Arbor, Michigan
Jan 27, 1979	No. 4	at Northwestern	L 65–83	11–5 (4–4)	Welsh–Ryan Arena; Evanston, Illinois
Feb 1, 1979	No. 14	No. 7 Ohio State	W 84–79 ^{OT}	12–5 (5–4)	Jenison Field House; East Lansing, Michigan
Feb 3, 1979	No. 14	Northwestern	W 61–50	13–5 (6–4)	Jenison Field House; East Lansing, Michigan
Feb 4, 1979*	No. 14	Kansas	W 85–61	14–5	Jenison Field House; East Lansing, Michigan
Feb 8, 1979	No. 10	at No. 15 Iowa	W 60–57	15–5 (7–4)	Iowa Field House; Iowa City, Iowa
Feb 10, 1979	No. 10	at No. 13 Ohio State	W 73–57	16–5 (8–4)	St. John Arena; Columbus, Ohio
Feb 15, 1979	No. 8	at Indiana	W 59–47	17–5 (9–4)	Assembly Hall; Bloomington, Indiana
Feb 17, 1979	No. 8	Michigan; Rivalry	W 80–57	18–5 (10–4)	Jenison Field House; East Lansing, Michigan
Feb 22, 1979	No. 7	No. 18 Purdue	W 73–67	19–5 (11–4)	Jenison Field House; East Lansing, Michigan
Feb 24, 1979	No. 4	Illinois	W 76–62	20–5 (12–4)	Jenison Field House; East Lansing, Michigan
Mar 1, 1979	No. 4	at Minnesota	W 76–63	21–5 (13–4)	Williams Arena; Minneapolis, Minnesota
Mar 3, 1979	No. 4	at Wisconsin	L 81–83	21–6 (13–5)	Wisconsin Field House; Madison, Wisconsin
NCAA Tournament
Mar 10, 1979*	(2 ME) No. 3	vs. (10 ME) Lamar; Second Round	W 95–64	22–6	Murphy Center; Murfreesboro, Tennessee
Mar 16, 1979*	(2 ME) No. 3	vs. (3 ME) No. 7 LSU; Regional semifinal	W 87–71	23–6	Market Square Arena; Indianapolis, Indiana
Mar 18, 1979*	(2 ME) No. 3	vs. (1 ME) No. 4 Notre Dame; Regional Final	W 80–68	24–6	Market Square Arena; Indianapolis, Indiana
Mar 22, 1979*	(2 ME) No. 3	vs. (9 E) No. 14 Penn; Final Four	W 101–67	25–6	Special Events Center; Salt Lake City
Mar 26, 1979*	(2 ME) No. 3	vs. (1 MW) No. 1 Indiana State; National Championship	W 75–64	26–6	Special Events Center; Salt Lake City
*Non-conference game. ^{#}Rankings from AP Poll. (#) Tournament seedings in parentheses. ME=MidEast Region. Source

== Rankings ==
Ranking movements Legend: ██ Increase in ranking ██ Decrease in ranking — = Not ranked
	Week																
Poll	Pre	1	2	3	4	5	6	7	8	9	10	11	12	13	14	15	Final
AP	7	7	4	3	5	4	1	1	6	4	15	10	8	7	4	4	3
Coaches	4	—	—	3	4	4	1	1	6	4	13	9	8	8	4	4	Not released

^Coaches did not release week 1 or week 2 polls.

== Awards and honors ==
- Earvin "Magic" Johnson, Consensus All-American teams
- Earvin "Magic" Johnson, Chicago Tribune Silver Basketball
- Earvin "Magic" Johnson, All-Big Ten First Team
- Gregory Kelser, All-Big Ten First Team

== Team players drafted into the NBA ==
Year	Round	Pick	Player	NBA Team
1979	1	1	Magic Johnson	Los Angeles Lakers
1979	1	4	Greg Kelser	Detroit Pistons
1980	4	74	Ron Charles	Chicago Bulls
1981	2	24	Jay Vincent	Dallas Mavericks
1981	8	181	Mike Brkovich	Milwaukee Bucks
