= 1978–79 Toledo Rockets men's basketball team =

American college basketball season

1978–79 Toledo Rockets men's basketball

MAC champions

NCAA Tournament, Sweet Sixteen
- Conference: Mid-American Conference

Ranking
- AP: No. 19
- Record: 22–8 (13–3 Mid-American)
- Head coach: Bob Nichols
- Assistant coach: Greg Kampe (1st season)
- Home arena: Centennial Hall

1978–79 Mid-American Conference men's basketball standings
| | Conf. | | | | Overall |
| Team | W | | L | PCT | W | | L | PCT |
|---|---|---|---|---|---|---|---|---|
| No. 19 Toledo | 13 | – | 3 | .813 | 22 | – | 8 | .733 |
| Central Michigan | 13 | – | 3 | .813 | 19 | – | 9 | .679 |
| Ohio | 10 | – | 6 | .625 | 16 | – | 11 | .593 |
| Ball State | 9 | – | 7 | .563 | 16 | – | 11 | .593 |
| Northern Illinois | 8 | – | 8 | .500 | 14 | – | 13 | .519 |
| Kent State | 7 | – | 9 | .438 | 13 | – | 14 | .481 |
| Bowling Green State | 6 | – | 10 | .375 | 14 | – | 13 | .519 |
| Miami (Ohio) | 6 | – | 10 | .375 | 9 | – | 18 | .333 |
| Eastern Michigan | 5 | – | 11 | .313 | 9 | – | 18 | .333 |
| Western Michigan | 3 | – | 13 | .188 | 7 | – | 23 | .233 |
Rankings from AP Poll

The 1978–79 Toledo Rockets men's basketball team represented University of Toledo as a member of the Mid-American Conference during the 1978–79 NCAA Division I men's basketball season. The team was led by head coach Bob Nichols and played their home games at Centennial Hall in Toledo, Ohio. Toledo won the MAC championship, reached the Sweet Sixteen of the NCAA Tournament for the only time in program history, and finished with a record of 22–8 (13–3 MAC).

== Roster ==
1978–79 Toledo Rockets men's basketball team
| Players | Coaches |
|---|---|
| Pos. / # / Name / Height / Weight / Year / Hometown; C / 40 / Jim Swaney / 6 ft 7 in (2.01 m) / — / Jr | Head coach: Bob Nichols; Assistant coach(es): Greg Kampe; Legend: (C) Team captain; (S) Suspended; (I) Ineligible; (W) Walk-on; Injured; Current redshirt |

== Schedule ==
| Date time, TV | Rank^{#} | Opponent^{#} | Result | Record | Site city, state |
Regular season
| Nov 25, 1978* | | at Detroit Mercy | L 64–67 | 0–1 | Calihan Hall; Detroit, Michigan |
| Nov 30, 1978* | | Ohio State | W 64–58 | 1–1 | John F. Savage Hall; Toledo, Ohio |
| Dec 9, 1978* | | at San Diego State | L 57–65 | 1–2 | San Diego Sports Arena; San Diego, California |
| Dec 13, 1978* | | Northwestern State | W 64–48 | 2–2 | John F. Savage Hall; Toledo, Ohio |
| Dec 16, 1978 | | at Eastern Michigan | W 76–42 | 3–2 (1–0) | Bowen Field House; Ypsilanti, Michigan |
| Dec 18, 1978* | | Catholic | W 98–62 | 4–2 | John F. Savage Hall; Toledo, Ohio |
| Dec 27, 1978* | | Loyola–Chicago | W 60–59 | 5–2 | John F. Savage Hall; Toledo, Ohio |
| Dec 29, 1978* | | Villanova | L 50–55 | 5–3 | John F. Savage Hall; Toledo, Ohio |
| Dec 30, 1978* | | Saint Louis | W 86–73 | 6–3 | John F. Savage Hall; Toledo, Ohio |
| Jan 3, 1979* | | Eastern Kentucky | W 82–57 | 7–3 | John F. Savage Hall; Toledo, Ohio |
| Jan 6, 1979 | | Kent State | W 72–47 | 8–3 (2–0) | John F. Savage Hall; Toledo, Ohio |
| Jan 10, 1979 | | at Northern Illinois | W 74–71 | 9–3 (3–0) | Chick Evans Fieldhouse; DeKalb, Illinois |
| Jan 13, 1979 | | at Ball State | W 69–62 | 10–3 (4–0) | Irving Gymnasium; Muncie, Indiana |
| Jan 17, 1979 | | Miami (OH) | W 63–54 | 11–3 (5–0) | John F. Savage Hall; Toledo, Ohio |
| Jan 20, 1979 | | at Western Michigan | W 80–72 | 12–3 (6–0) | University Arena; Kalamazoo, Michigan |
| Jan 24, 1979 | | Ohio | W 79–67 | 13–3 (7–0) | John F. Savage Hall; Toledo, Ohio |
| Jan 27, 1979 | | at Central Michigan | L 66–77 | 13–4 (7–1) | Rose Arena; Mount Pleasant, Michigan |
| Jan 30, 1979* | | Butler | W 101–71 | 14–4 | John F. Savage Hall; Toledo, Ohio |
| Feb 3, 1979 | | Bowling Green State | W 72–61 | 15–4 (8–1) | John F. Savage Hall; Toledo, Ohio |
| Feb 7, 1979 | | Northern Illinois | W 87–46 | 16–4 (9–1) | John F. Savage Hall; Toledo, Ohio |
| Feb 10, 1979 | | at Kent State | L 68–69 | 16–5 (9–2) | Memorial Athletic and Convocation Center; Kent, Ohio |
| Feb 14, 1979* | | at Dayton | L 68–69 | 16–6 | University of Dayton Arena; Dayton, Ohio |
| Feb 17, 1979 | | Ball State | W 82–69 | 17–6 (10–2) | John F. Savage Hall; Toledo, Ohio |
| Feb 21, 1979 | | at Miami (OH) | L 68–72 | 17–7 (10–3) | Millett Hall; Oxford, Ohio |
| Feb 24, 1979 | | Western Michigan | W 57–49 | 18–7 (11–3) | John F. Savage Hall; Toledo, Ohio |
| Feb 28, 1979 | | at Ohio | W 75–70 | 19–7 (12–3) | Convocation Center; Athens, Ohio |
| Mar 3, 1979 | | Eastern Michigan | W 79–43 | 20–7 (13–3) | John F. Savage Hall; Toledo, Ohio |
| Mar 6, 1979* | | vs. Central Michigan; MAC Playoff | W 72–65 | 21–7 | Crisler Arena; Ann Arbor, Michigan |
NCAA Tournament
| Mar 11, 1979* | (5 ME) No. 19 | vs. (4 ME) No. 14 Iowa; Second Round | W 74–72 | 22–7 | Assembly Hall; Bloomington, Indiana |
| Mar 16, 1979* | (5 ME) No. 19 | vs. (1 ME) No. 4 Notre Dame; Mideast Regional semifinal – Sweet Sixteen | L 71–79 | 22–8 | Market Square Arena; Indianapolis, Indiana |
*Non-conference game. ^{#}Rankings from AP Poll. (#) Tournament seedings in parentheses. ME=Mideast.
