= 1978–79 Wisconsin Badgers men's basketball team =

American college basketball season

1978–79 Wisconsin Badgers men's basketball
- Conference: Big Ten Conference
- Record: 12–15 (6–12 Big Ten)
- Head coach: Bill Cofield (3rd season)
- Home arena: UW Fieldhouse

1978–79 Big Ten Conference men's basketball standings
	Conf.				Overall
Team	W		L	PCT	W		L	PCT
No. 3 Michigan State	13	–	5	.722	26	–	6	.813
No. 15 Purdue	13	–	5	.722	27	–	8	.771
No. 20 Iowa	13	–	5	.722	20	–	8	.714
Ohio State	12	–	6	.667	19	–	12	.613
Indiana	10	–	8	.556	22	–	12	.647
Michigan	8	–	10	.444	15	–	12	.556
Illinois	7	–	11	.389	19	–	11	.633
Wisconsin	6	–	12	.333	12	–	15	.444
Minnesota	6	–	12	.333	11	–	16	.407
Northwestern	2	–	16	.111	6	–	21	.222
Rankings from AP Poll

The 1978–79 Wisconsin Badgers men's basketball team represented University of Wisconsin–Madison. The head coach was Bill Cofield, coaching his third season with the Badgers. The team played their home games at the UW Fieldhouse in Madison, Wisconsin and was a member of the Big Ten Conference.

== Roster ==
1978–79 Wisconsin Badgers men's basketball team
Players
Coaches

Pos.	#	Name	Height	Weight	Year	Hometown
C	00	Larry Petty	6 ft 9 in (2.06 m)	245 lb (111 kg)	So	New York, New York
G	10	Arnold Gaines (C)	6 ft 4 in (1.93 m)	190 lb (86 kg)	Jr	Baltimore, Maryland
G	11	Wes Matthews	6 ft 1 in (1.85 m)	165 lb (75 kg)	So	Bridgeport, Connecticut
F	12	John Bailey	6 ft 3 in (1.91 m)	170 lb (77 kg)	Fr	Macon, Georgia
G/F	15	Tim Stracka	6 ft 4 in (1.93 m)	195 lb (88 kg)	Fr	Madison, Wisconsin
G	21	Dan Hastings	6 ft 4 in (1.93 m)	185 lb (84 kg)	So	Drexel Hill, Pennsylvania
F	30	James Smith	6 ft 6 in (1.98 m)	190 lb (86 kg)	Fr	Pittsburgh, Pennsylvania
G/F	32	Robert Jenkins	6 ft 3 in (1.91 m)	187 lb (85 kg)	Jr	Milwaukee, Wisconsin
F	35	Claude Gregory	6 ft 8 in (2.03 m)	205 lb (93 kg)	So	Washington, D.C.
C	40	Mark Newburg	6 ft 11 in (2.11 m)	225 lb (102 kg)	Jr	La Crosse, Wisconsin
F/C	41	Keith Mitchell	6 ft 9 in (2.06 m)	208 lb (94 kg)	Fr	Taylor, Michigan
F	44	Gary Zinkgraf	6 ft 7 in (2.01 m)	205 lb (93 kg)	Fr	Bethesda, Maryland
F	50	Joe Chrnelich (C)	6 ft 7 in (2.01 m)	215 lb (98 kg)	Jr	Milwaukee, Wisconsin

Head coach

- Bill Cofield (McKendree)

Assistant coach(es)

- Bo Ryan (Wilkes)
- Larry Reed (Milwaukee)
- Todd Landrum (Ohio Northern)

Legend

- (C) Team captain
- (S) Suspended
- (I) Ineligible
- (W) Walk-on
- Injured
- Current redshirt

== Schedule ==
Date time, TV	Rank^{#}	Opponent^{#}	Result	Record	Site city, state
Regular Season
11/24/1978*		UW—Milwaukee	W 74–55	1–0	UW Fieldhouse; Madison, WI
11/28/1978*		at St. Johns	W 73–68	2–0	Alumni Hall; New York City, NY
12/1/1978*		Long Island; Wisconsin Invitational	W 89–70	3–0	UW Fieldhouse; Madison, WI
12/2/1978*		Saint Louis; Wisconsin Invitational	W 66–63	4–0	UW Fieldhouse; Madison, WI
12/9/1978*		Loyola (IL)	W 79–74	5–0	UW Fieldhouse; Madison, WI
12/16/1978*		at DePaul	L 78–84	5–1	Alumni Hall; Chicago, IL
12/23/1978*		No. 16 Marquette	W 65–52	6–1	UW Fieldhouse; Madison, WI
12/28/1978*		at No. 16 Louisville; Holiday Classic	L 53–70	6–2	Freedom Hall; Louisville, KY
12/29/1978*		vs. Oral Roberts; Holiday Classic	L 69–102	6–3	Freedom Hall; Louisville, KY
1/4/1979		at No. 1 Michigan State	L 55–84	6–4 (0–1)	Jenison Fieldhouse; Lansing. MI
1/6/1979		at Ohio State	L 71–82	6–5 (0–2)	St. John Arena; Columbus, OH
1/11/1979		Northwestern	W 95–82	7–5 (1–2)	UW Fieldhouse; Madison, WI
1/13/1979		Michigan	W 77–66	8–5 (2–2)	UW Fieldhouse; Madison, WI
1/18/1979		No. 8 Illinois	L 74–81	8–6 (2–3)	UW Fieldhouse; Madison, WI
1/20/1979		at Minnesota	L 72–82	8–7 (2–4)	Williams Arena; Minneapolis, MN
1/25/1979		at Indiana	L 61–82	8–8 (2–5)	Assembly Hall; Bloomington, IN
1/27/1979		at Purdue	L 60–73	8–9 (2–6)	Mackey Arena; West Lafayette, IN
2/1/1979		No. 15 Iowa	L 64–70	8–10 (2–7)	UW Fieldhouse; Madison, WI
2/3/1979		Purdue	L 48–54	8–11 (2–8)	UW Fieldhouse; Madison, WI
2/8/1979		Minnesota	L 72–74	8–12 (2–9)	UW Fieldhouse; Madison, WI
2/10/1979		at No. 14 Iowa	L 65–79	8–13 (2–10)	Carver–Hawkeye Arena; Iowa City, IA
2/15/1979		at Illinois	L 64–81	8–14 (2–11)	Assembly Hall; Champaign, IL
2/17/1979		at Indiana	L 62–68 ^{OT}	8–15 (2–12)	UW Fieldhouse; Madison, WI
2/22/1979		at Michigan	W 66–65	9–15 (3–12)	Crisler Arena; Ann Arbor, MI
2/24/1979		at Northwestern	W 72–70	10–15 (4–12)	McGaw Memorial Hall; Evanston, IL
3/1/1979		Ohio State	W 76–73	11–15 (5–12)	UW Fieldhouse; Madison, WI
3/3/1979		No. 4 Michigan State	W 83–81	12–15 (6–12)	UW Fieldhouse; Madison, WI
*Non-conference game. ^{#}Rankings from AP Poll. (#) Tournament seedings in parentheses.
