= 1978–79 Michigan Wolverines men's basketball team =

American college basketball season

1978–79 Michigan Wolverines men's basketball
- Conference: Big Ten Conference
- Record: 15–12 (8–10 Big Ten)
- Head coach: Johnny Orr
- Assistant coaches: Bill Frieder; Jim Boyce; Tom Kempf
- MVP: Dion Harris

1978–79 Big Ten Conference men's basketball standings
	Conf.				Overall
Team	W		L	PCT	W		L	PCT
No. 3 Michigan State	13	–	5	.722	26	–	6	.813
No. 15 Purdue	13	–	5	.722	27	–	8	.771
No. 20 Iowa	13	–	5	.722	20	–	8	.714
Ohio State	12	–	6	.667	19	–	12	.613
Indiana	10	–	8	.556	22	–	12	.647
Michigan	8	–	10	.444	15	–	12	.556
Illinois	7	–	11	.389	19	–	11	.633
Wisconsin	6	–	12	.333	12	–	15	.444
Minnesota	6	–	12	.333	11	–	16	.407
Northwestern	2	–	16	.111	6	–	21	.222
Rankings from AP Poll

The 1978–79 Michigan Wolverines men's basketball team represented the University of Michigan in intercollegiate college basketball during the 1978–79 season. The team played its home games in the Crisler Arena in Ann Arbor, Michigan, and was a member of the Big Ten Conference. Under the direction of head coach Johnny Orr, the team finished tied for seventh in the Big Ten Conference. The team failed to earn an invitation to either the 1978 National Invitation Tournament or the 1978 NCAA Men's Division I Basketball Tournament. The team was ranked in the Associated Press Top Twenty-Five Poll for eight of the season's seventeen weeks, reaching a number 6 ranking on December 5, 1978, and falling out after the January 9, 1979, poll.

== Rankings ==
Ranking movements Legend: ██ Increase in ranking ██ Decrease in ranking
	Week																
Poll	Pre	1	2	3	4	5	6	7	8	9	10	11	12	13	14	15	Final
AP Poll	8	8	6	9	9	8	13	16									

== Team players drafted into the NBA ==
Five players from this team were selected in the NBA draft.

Year	Round	Pick	Overall	Player	NBA Club
1979	1	15	15	Phil Hubbard	Detroit Pistons
1981	1	19	19	Mike McGee	Los Angeles Lakers
1981	3	23	69	John Johnson	Boston Celtics
1981	5	20	112	Paul Heuerman	Phoenix Suns
1982	7	3	141	Thad Gardner	Utah Jazz
