= 1978–79 Illinois Fighting Illini men's basketball team =

American college basketball season

1978–79 Illinois Fighting Illini men's basketball

Kentucky Invitational Tournament, Champion

Glacier Bowl Classic, Champion
- Conference: Big Ten Conference
- Record: 19–11 (7–11 Big Ten)
- Head coach: Lou Henson (4th season)
- Assistant coaches: Tony Yates (5th season); Mark Bial (2nd season); Les Wothke (4th season)
- MVP: Mark Smith
- Captain: Larry Lubin
- Home arena: Assembly Hall

1978–79 Big Ten Conference men's basketball standings
	Conf.				Overall
Team	W		L	PCT	W		L	PCT
No. 3 Michigan State	13	–	5	.722	26	–	6	.813
No. 15 Purdue	13	–	5	.722	27	–	8	.771
No. 20 Iowa	13	–	5	.722	20	–	8	.714
Ohio State	12	–	6	.667	19	–	12	.613
Indiana	10	–	8	.556	22	–	12	.647
Michigan	8	–	10	.444	15	–	12	.556
Illinois	7	–	11	.389	19	–	11	.633
Wisconsin	6	–	12	.333	12	–	15	.444
Minnesota	6	–	12	.333	11	–	16	.407
Northwestern	2	–	16	.111	6	–	21	.222
Rankings from AP Poll

The 1978–79 Illinois Fighting Illini men's basketball team represented the University of Illinois.

== Regular season ==
In 1978–79 season, Illinois finished seventh in the Big Ten, but went 19–11 overall, including ascension to No. 2 in the national polls after starting the year 15–0. During this season, Illinois upset top-ranked Michigan State and Magic Johnson, 57–55, in one of the school's most memorable games. It was during this season that Illinois also led the nation in field-goal percentage defense (.404).

=== Roster ===
1978–79 Illinois Fighting Illini men's basketball team
Players
Coaches

Pos.	#	Name	Height	Weight	Year	Previous school	Hometown
G	10	Reno Gray (redshirt)	6 ft 2 in (1.88 m)	170 lb (77 kg)	RS Jr	Hales Franciscan High School	Chicago, Illinois
G	12	Kevin Westervelt	6 ft 1 in (1.85 m)	165 lb (75 kg)	Jr	Richwoods High School	Peoria, Illinois
C	13	James Griffin	6 ft 10 in (2.08 m)	200 lb (91 kg)	Fr	Dunbar High School	Grandview, Texas
G	15	Cletis Hubbard	6 ft 0 in (1.83 m)	180 lb (82 kg)	Sr	Dunbar High School	Ft. Worth, Texas
G	20	Matt Meyer	6 ft 0 in (1.83 m)	165 lb (75 kg)	Sr	Foreman High School	Mantino, Illinois
G	21	Steve Lanter	6 ft 4 in (1.93 m)	190 lb (86 kg)	RS Jr	Mascoutah Community High School	Belleville, Illinois
G	22	Perry Range	6 ft 4 in (1.93 m)	180 lb (82 kg)	Fr	South Beloit High School	South Beloit, Illinois
G	23	Larry Lubin (C)	6 ft 0 in (1.83 m)	175 lb (79 kg)	Sr	New Trier High School	Glencoe, Illinois
G	30	Rob Judson	6 ft 2 in (1.88 m)	175 lb (79 kg)	Jr	Zion-Benton High School	Zion, Illinois
F	31	Neil Bresnahan	6 ft 6 in (1.98 m)	200 lb (91 kg)	Jr	Fenwick High School	Oak Park, Illinois
F	32	Levi Cobb	6 ft 6 in (1.98 m)	200 lb (91 kg)	Jr	Morgan Park High School	Chicago, Illinois
F	33	Eddie Johnson	6 ft 8 in (2.03 m)	210 lb (95 kg)	So	Westinghouse High School	Chicago, Illinois
F	42	Mark Smith	6 ft 7 in (2.01 m)	195 lb (88 kg)	So	Richwoods High School	Peoria, Illinois
F	43	Bryan Leonard	6 ft 10 in (2.08 m)	210 lb (95 kg)	Fr	Belleville High School-East	Belleville, Illinois
C	44	Derek Holcomb	6 ft 11 in (2.11 m)	230 lb (104 kg)	So	Richwoods High School	Peoria, Illinois

Head coach

- Lou Henson (New Mexico State University) (4th year)

Assistant coach(es)

- Tony Yates (University of Cincinnati) (5th year)
- Les Wothke (Greenville University) (4th year)
- Mark Bial (University of Illinois) (2nd year)

Legend

- (C) Team captain
- (S) Suspended
- (I) Ineligible
- (W) Walk-on
- Injured
- Current redshirt

Roster

== Schedule ==
Date time, TV	Rank^{#}	Opponent^{#}	Result	Record	Site (attendance) city, state
Non-Conference regular season
11/24/1978*		Texas-Arlington	W 109–74	1–0	Assembly Hall (9,097); Champaign, IL
11/28/1978*		Denver	W 81–57	2–0	Assembly Hall (10,092); Champaign, IL
12/2/1978*		at Tulane	W 65–60	3–0	Devlin Fieldhouse (3,542); New Orleans, LA
12/5/1978*		at Missouri; Show-Me Classic	W 69–57	4–0	Hearnes Center (6,002); Columbia, MO
12/8/1978*		South Carolina	W 64–57	5–0	Assembly Hall (12,156); Champaign, IL
12/9/1978*		Centenary	W 86–60	6–0	Assembly Hall (10,082); Champaign, IL
12/16/1978*	No. 18	at Kent State	W 82–44	7–0	Memorial Athletic and Convocation Center (1,020); Kent, OH
12/22/1978*	No. 15	vs. No. 8 Syracuse; Kentucky Invitational Tournament	W 64–61	8–0	Rupp Arena (21,000); Lexington, KY
12/23/1978*	No. 15	vs. No. 7 Texas A&M; Kentucky Invitational Tournament	W 71–57	9–0	Rupp Arena (23,272); Lexington, KY
12/28/1978*	No. 6	vs. Western Michigan; Glacier Bowl Classic	W 84–79	10–0	Buckner Fieldhouse (–); Anchorage, AK
12/29/1978*	No. 6	vs. Ozarks; Glacier Bowl Classic	W 88–82	11–0	Buckner Fieldhouse (–); Anchorage, AK
12/30/1978*	No. 6	at Alaska-Anchorage; Glacier Bowl Classic	W 92–80	12–0	Buckner Fieldhouse (–); Anchorage, AK
Big Ten regular season
1/4/1979	No. 4	at Indiana; Rivalry	W 65–61	13–0 (1–0)	Assembly Hall (16,104); Bloomington, IN
1/6/1979	No. 4	at Northwestern; Rivalry	W 75–56	14–0 (2–0)	McGaw Memorial Hall (7,122); Evanston, IL
1/11/1979	No. 4	No. 1 Michigan State	W 57–55	15–0 (3–0)	Assembly Hall (16,209); Champaign, IL
1/13/1979	No. 4	Ohio State	L 66–69 ^{OT}	15–1 (3–1)	Assembly Hall (12,088); Champaign, IL
1/18/1979	No. 4	at Wisconsin	W 81–74	16–1 (4–1)	Wisconsin Field House (12,204); Madison, WI
1/20/1979	No. 4	Purdue	L 57–69	16–2 (4–2)	Assembly Hall (16,458); Champaign, IL
1/25/1979	No. 8	at Iowa; Rivalry	L 52–58	16–3 (4–3)	Iowa Field House (13,355); Iowa City, IA
1/27/1979	No. 8	Michigan	L 54–56	16–4 (4–4)	Assembly Hall (16,473); Champaign, IL
2/1/1979	No. 14	Minnesota	W 67–57	17–4 (5–4)	Assembly Hall (14,383); Champaign, IL
2/3/1979	No. 14	at Michigan	L 65–74	17–5 (5–5)	Crisler Center (13,609); Ann Arbor, MI
2/8/1979	No. 20	at Purdue	L 65–71	17–6 (5–6)	Mackey Arena (14,123); West Lafayette, IN
2/10/1979	No. 20	at Minnesota	W 59–57	18–6 (6–6)	Williams Arena (16,615); Minneapolis, MN
2/15/1979		Wisconsin	W 81–64	19–6 (7–6)	Assembly Hall (12,880); Champaign, IL
2/17/1979		No. 14 Iowa; Rivalry	L 53–67	19–7 (7–7)	Assembly Hall (9,441); Champaign, IL
2/22/1979		at No. 14 Ohio State	L 55–73	19–8 (7–8)	St. John Arena (13,489); Columbus, OH
2/24/1979		at No. 7 Michigan State	L 62–76	19–9 (7–9)	Jenison Fieldhouse (10,004); East Lansing, MI
3/1/1979		Northwestern; Rivalry	L 64–71	19–10 (7–10)	Assembly Hall (12,390); Champaign, IL
3/3/1979		Indiana; Rivalry	L 60–72	19–11 (7–11)	Assembly Hall (16,503); Champaign, IL
*Non-conference game. ^{#}Rankings from AP Poll. (#) Tournament seedings in parentheses. All times are in Central Time.

== Player stats ==
Player	Games Played	Minutes played	Field goals	Free throws	Rebounds	Assists	Blocks	Steals	Points
Mark Smith	30	897	160	84	173	121	23	53	404
Eddie Johnson	30	786	168	26	170	52	4	18	362
Rob Judson	30	918	123	35	68	61	3	33	281
Neil Bresnahan	30	840	105	40	236	75	7	32	250
James Griffin	30	426	105	19	98	7	29	12	229
Derek Holcomb	29	818	90	34	190	49	86	17	214
Levi Cobb	30	504	68	24	122	29	4	19	160
Steve Lanter	27	473	35	16	38	52	1	15	72
Perry Range	24	180	21	14	25	12	0	8	56
Bryan Leonard	16	45	6	11	11	1	4	2	23
Larry Lubin	22	88	6	0	4	9	1	6	12
Kevin Westervelt	8	15	2	5	3	0	0	0	9
Cletis Hubbard	8	22	2	2	2	4	0	1	6
Matt Meyer	6	9	0	0	1	0	0	0	0
Dave Schulter	2	5	0	0	1	1	0	0	0

== Awards and honors ==
- Eddie Johnson
  - Fighting Illini All-Century team (2005)
- Mark Smith
  - Team Most Valuable Player

== Team players drafted into the NBA ==
Player	NBA club	Round	Pick
