= 1978–79 Iowa Hawkeyes men's basketball team =

American college basketball season

1978–79 Iowa Hawkeyes men's basketball

Big Ten Champions

NCAA Tournament Mideast Region 4 Seed
- Conference: Big Ten Conference

Ranking
- Coaches: No. 11
- AP: No. 20
- Record: 20–8 (13–5 Big Ten)
- Head coach: Lute Olson (5th season)
- Assistant coaches: Jim Rosborough; Tony McAndrews
- MVP: Ronnie Lester
- Home arena: Iowa Field House (Capacity: 13,365)

1978–79 Big Ten Conference men's basketball standings
	Conf.				Overall
Team	W		L	PCT	W		L	PCT
No. 3 Michigan State	13	–	5	.722	26	–	6	.813
No. 15 Purdue	13	–	5	.722	27	–	8	.771
No. 20 Iowa	13	–	5	.722	20	–	8	.714
Ohio State	12	–	6	.667	19	–	12	.613
Indiana	10	–	8	.556	22	–	12	.647
Michigan	8	–	10	.444	15	–	12	.556
Illinois	7	–	11	.389	19	–	11	.633
Wisconsin	6	–	12	.333	12	–	15	.444
Minnesota	6	–	12	.333	11	–	16	.407
Northwestern	2	–	16	.111	6	–	21	.222
Rankings from AP Poll

The 1978–79 Iowa Hawkeyes men's basketball team represented the University of Iowa in the 1978–79 college basketball season. The team was led by head coach Lute Olson and played their home games at the Iowa Field House. They finished the season with a 20–8 record and, with a 13–5 conference record, earned a Big Ten Championship (three-way tie with Michigan State and Purdue). To date, this is the last regular-season conference title for the Hawkeyes men's basketball team.

== Roster ==
1978–79 Iowa Hawkeyes men's basketball team
Players
Coaches

Pos.	#	Name	Height	Weight	Year	Hometown
G	12	Ronnie Lester	6 ft 2 in (1.88 m)	175 lb (79 kg)	Jr	Chicago, Illinois
G	20	Dick Peth	6 ft 2 in (1.88 m)	—	Sr	Tomah, Wisconsin
G	23	Kirk Speraw	6 ft 0 in (1.83 m)	—	Sr	Sioux City, Iowa
F	24	William Mayfield	6 ft 7 in (2.01 m)	205 lb (93 kg)	Sr	Detroit, Michigan
G	30	Kenny Arnold	6 ft 2 in (1.88 m)	185 lb (84 kg)	So	Chicago, Illinois
G	32	Vince Brookins	6 ft 5 in (1.96 m)	205 lb (93 kg)	So	Cleveland, Ohio
G	34	Tom Norman	6 ft 2 in (1.88 m)	—		Iowa City, Iowa
F	40	Kevin Boyle	6 ft 6 in (1.98 m)	195 lb (88 kg)	Fr	Chicago, Illinois
F	42	Mike Henry	6 ft 9 in (2.06 m)	205 lb (93 kg)	So	Elgin, Illinois
F	44	Clay Hargrave	6 ft 4 in (1.93 m)	—	Sr	Iowa City, Iowa
C	52	Steve Waite	6 ft 10 in (2.08 m)	225 lb (102 kg)	So	Iowa City, Iowa
C	54	Steve Krafcisin	6 ft 9 in (2.06 m)	225 lb (102 kg)	So	Chicago, Illinois

Head coach

Lute Olson

Assistant coach(es)

- Jim Rosborough
- Tony McAndrews

Legend

- (C) Team captain
- (S) Suspended
- (I) Ineligible
- (W) Walk-on
- Injured
- Current redshirt

Roster

== Schedule ==
Big Ten Conference Standing: 1st
Date	Opponent*	Rank*	Location	Time^{#}	Result	Overall	Conference
**Regular Season Games**
November 25, 1978	Kent State		Iowa City, IA		W 111–76	1–0	
November 28, 1978	Wichita State		Iowa City, IA		W 91–67	2–0	
December 2, 1978	Colorado State		Fort Collins, CO		L 69–72	2–1	
December 9, 1978	Drake		Des Moines, IA		L 69–72	2–2	
December 11, 1978	Iowa State		Iowa City, IA		W 67–66	3–2	
December 16, 1978	Illinois Wesleyan		Bloomington, IL		W 99–55	4–2	
December 23, 1978	Drake		Iowa City, IA		W 112–73	5–2	
December 29, 1978	Penn		San Diego, CA		W 87–84 2OT	6–2	
December 30, 1978	Stanford		San Diego, CA		W 83–68	7–2	
January 4, 1979	**Northwestern**		Evanston, IL		W 65–57	8–2	1–0
January 6, 1979	**#13 Michigan**		Ann Arbor, MI		W 85–79	9–2	2–0
February 24, 1979	**#14 Ohio State**	#12	Columbus, OH		W 83–68	19–6	12–4
March 1, 1979	**Michigan**	#11	Iowa City, IA		L 53–61	19–7	12–5
March 3, 1979	**Northwestern**	#11	Iowa City, IA		W 95–64	20–7	13–5
**NCAA Tournament**
March 11, 1979	Toledo	#14	Bloomington, IN		L 72–74	20–8	13–5
*Rank according to AP Top 20 Poll. ^{#}All times are in CST. Conference games in **BOLD**.

== Awards and honors ==
- Ronnie Lester – Second-Team AP All-American, Third-Team UPI and NABC All-American
- Kevin Boyle – Big Ten Freshman of the Year
