= Bill Oates =

American basketball coach (1939–2020)

Biographical details
- Born: October 15, 1939
- Died: February 5, 2020 (aged 80)

Playing career
- 1958–1961: Occidental

Coaching career (HC unless noted)
- 1970–1975: Santa Ana College
- 1975–1979: Athletes in Action
- 1979–1986: Saint Mary's
- 1988–1993: Menlo
- 1993–2006: The Master's

Bill Oates (October 15, 1939 – February 5, 2020) was an American basketball coach. He coached college basketball for thirty years and amassed over 500 victories, most notably at NCAA Division I Saint Mary's and at the Master's College, and served as coach for Athletes in Action's basketball program. He was the coach for the United States team in the 1978 FIBA World Championship in the Philippines.

Oates died on February 5, 2020, at age 80.
