= Indiana–Purdue rivalry =

American college sports rivalry

- Indiana Hoosiers Purdue Boilermakers
- Sport: Football, basketball, baseball

Locations of Indiana and Purdue

College Comparison
| | Indiana | Purdue |
|---|---|---|
| Founded | 1820 | 1869 |
| Location | Bloomington, IN | West Lafayette, IN |
| Students | 45,328 | 49,639 |
| School colors | | |
| Nickname | Hoosiers | Boilermakers |
| Varsity Teams | 24 | 20 |
| NCAA Championships | 24 | 3 |
| Governor's Cup wins | 14 | 7 |

The Indiana–Purdue rivalry is a rivalry between the Indiana University Bloomington Hoosiers and the Purdue University Boilermakers, the two flagship public universities in the state of Indiana. It is regarded as one of the most intense collegiate rivalries in the United States, and one of the strongest and most followed collegiate rivalries in the Big Ten Conference. Among college sports rivalries, Newsweek listed it among the top 12 and Huffington Post listed it as the fifth best overall.

Both teams have been part of the Big Ten Conference for over 100 years, with Purdue being a founding member.

== Men's basketball ==
Indiana–Purdue men's basketball rivalry
- Indiana Hoosiers Purdue Boilermakers
- Sport: Basketball
- First meeting: March 2, 1901; Purdue 20 – Indiana 15
- Latest meeting: February 20, 2026; Purdue 93 – Indiana 64

Statistics
- Total meetings: 223
- All-time series: Purdue leads, 129–94
- Largest victory: Purdue, 62–15 (1910)
- Longest win streak: Indiana, 13 (1949–1955)
- Current win streak: Purdue, 1 (2026–present)

Men's Basketball Comparison
| | Indiana | Purdue |
|---|---|---|
| NCAA Championships | 5 | 0 |
| NCAA Tournament Appearances | 41 | 36 |
| NIT Championships | 1 | 1 |
| NIT Appearances | 6 | 8 |
| Pre-1939 National Titles | 0 | 1 |
| Big Ten Championships | 22 | 26 |
| Big Ten tournament Championships | 0 | 3 |
| All-Americans | 42 | 47 |
| Consensus 1st Team All-Americans | 15 | 28 |
| National Player of the Year | 2 | 3 |
| Big Ten Player of the Year | 6 | 6 |
| Big Ten Coach of the Year | 6 | 12 |

Indiana and Purdue played against each other in men's basketball for the first time on March 2, 1901. The two teams have played at least once a year since then, and until 2001 they usually met twice a year. Purdue leads the all-time series 128–93. Purdue has won the Big Ten Conference regular season title 26 times, and Indiana has won it 22. Since the Big Ten began basketball in the 1904–05 season, the schools have combined to win or share over 39% of the conference championships. Both are among the winningest programs in Division I basketball; through the end of the 2022–23 season, Indiana is 10th on the list, while Purdue is 12th.

Additionally, Indiana has won 5 NCAA championships in basketball. Indiana was also voted the UPI National Champions in 1975. Purdue was retroactively awarded the 1932 Helms Foundation and Premo-Porretta Power Poll national titles. Both Indiana and Purdue have captured one post-season NIT championship; Purdue won in 1974 and Indiana won in 1979. The two teams also met in the postseason the following year in the 1980 NCAA Sweet 16, with Purdue winning on their way to the Final Four. That was their first, and only, head-to-head NCAA Tournament game.

Purdue won 51 of the first 62 games through 1939, including four winning streaks of more than eight games. In 1940, Indiana won both yearly contests for the first time ever and went on to win their first NCAA Championship. The rivalry favored Indiana in the 1940s and 1950s, with the Hoosiers winning 25 out of the 37 games during the two decades. The intensity of the rivalry reached new heights throughout the 1970s, 80s, and 90s when Bob Knight and Gene Keady coached Indiana and Purdue, respectively. The two legends combined for 17 Big Ten titles and 13 Big Ten Coach of the Year awards while leading the Hoosiers and Boilers. The rivalry has become re-energized in recent years under Purdue's Matt Painter dominance and Indiana's constant changing of head coaches, helping restore the rivalry. ESPN has labeled the basketball rivalry as "one of the two or three best rivalries in the sport," while College Magazine ranked it as the 10th best college basketball rivalry and TotalProSports listed it as the seventh best.

=== Notable games and incidents ===
==== Disputed 1901 game ====
Indiana and Purdue first met on March 2, 1901, in Bloomington, with a 20–15 Purdue win. Indiana originally planned to play a second game against Purdue in West Lafayette, but according to The Purdue Exponent, the game was "declared off on account of General [Benjamin] Harrison's death." This was supported by the Arbutus (the Indiana school yearbook) and the 1901 Debris (Purdue's school yearbook). However, official records of Indiana and Purdue indicate that Indiana lost to Purdue 23–19 in West Lafayette on March 15, 1901.

==== 1969: Mauling at Mackey ====
On March 8, 1969, and on their way to the 1969 National Championship game, the Boilermakers trounced the Hoosiers 120–76 behind 40 from Rick Mount and 31 from Billy Keller. Indiana coach Lou Watson remarked after the game, "I'm so glad that's over. That Keller killed us." The Boilermakers would eventually fall 92–72 to the UCLA Bruins in the 1969 National Championship Game.

==== 1976: Undefeated season ====
On February 16, 1976, IU defeated Purdue at Mackey Arena 74–71. This victory was IU's 6th in a row over Purdue. The Indiana Hoosiers would go on to finish the Big Ten undefeated at 18-0 for the second season in a row and win their 4th straight Big Ten Championship. The Indiana Hoosiers would also go on to finish the season undefeated at 32-0 and win the school's 3rd National Championship: no other D-1 basketball program has finished a season undefeated since IU did so in 1976. The Hoosiers only lost one game during the 1974–75 and 1975–76 seasons, which has also not been accomplished by any D-1 program since during a 2-season period.

==== 1979: NIT Championship ====
Indiana and Purdue met on March 21, 1979, in the final game of the 1979 NIT Championship. Going toe to toe during this game was Indiana star Ray Tolbert, who would go on to receive co-MVP honors for the NIT Tournament. Purdue's Joe Barry Carroll would be the main star for the Boilermakers. Indiana won 53–52.

==== 1980: NCAA Sweet 16 ====
On March 13, 1980, Indiana faced Purdue in the 1980 NCAA Sweet 16, held in Lexington. Purdue ultimately won the game 76–69. Purdue reached the Final Four before losing to UCLA. This was Purdue's most recent Final Four appearance until 2024.

==== 1981: "Sucker punch" and jackass feud ====
In a game at Bloomington on January 31, 1981, the Hoosiers' Isiah Thomas punched Purdue guard Roosevelt Barnes.

In 1981, Knight used a "jackass" (male donkey) to represent Purdue athletic director George King when he declined to appear on a talk show with him to address derisive chants Knight claimed had been directed at Indiana University and its personnel. The 1980–81 Hoosiers would go on to win the 1981 NCAA National Championship, the school's fourth national title.

==== 1985: Knight chair throwing incident ====
On February 23, 1985, a scramble for a loose ball resulted in a foul call on Indiana's Steve Alford. Bobby Knight insisted the call should have been for a jump ball and seconds later after the Purdue inbounds, a subsequent foul was called on Daryl Thomas. Knight received a technical foul and then threw a red plastic chair from Indiana's bench across the floor toward the basket and received his 2nd technical. Knight continued until he received a 3rd technical and was ejected from the game by NCAA rule (since then, NCAA rules have changed so that two technical fouls earn an automatic ejection).

Knight was ejected, but he received a standing ovation as he left the floor from the home crowd at Assembly Hall, and the crowd quickly became hostile and dangerous. Fans went so far as to throw coins at the Purdue bench after Knight's ejection. Despite the crowd, Purdue went on to defeat Indiana 72–63 on their way to a 20–9 season, while Indiana finished the year 16–13 and missed the NCAA tournament.

Knight apologized for his actions the next day and was given a one-game suspension and two years probation from the Big Ten. Since the incident, Knight has occasionally joked about throwing the chair. A common joke told by Knight is that he saw an old lady standing on the opposite sideline and threw her the chair so she could sit down. The picture of Knight throwing the red plastic chair across the floor in front of Reid has since become the symbol of the Indiana–Purdue rivalry. Replays of the toss have been shown during nearly every match-up at Mackey Arena since 1985.

==== 1991: Knight tirade ====
At a practice leading up to an Indiana-Purdue game in 1991, Bob Knight unleashed a torrent of expletives and threats with the intended purpose of motivating his Indiana team. Unknown to most, someone was secretly taping the speech, which went viral and garnered over 1.83 million views on YouTube. Although the source of who taped the speech remains unknown, many former players suspect it was former manager and current NBA coach Lawrence Frank. Indiana would go on to beat Purdue 65–62.

==== 1997: Keady milestone ====
In a February 18, 1997 game at Bloomington, Purdue won their 4th game in a row against the Hoosiers. It was coach Gene Keady's 400th career win.

==== 2002: Duel in the Dome ====
The Big Ten had featured an imbalanced conference schedule since increasing to 11 members in 1993, and it finally reached the Indiana–Purdue rivalry as the two were only scheduled for one meeting in each of the 2001–02 and 2002–03 seasons. However, the two schools planned a non-conference game for December 14, 2002, at the RCA Dome in Indianapolis. The game was nicknamed the "Duel in the Dome" and a total of 32,055 Hoosier and Boiler fans filled into the Dome to see the game.

The #7 ranked Hoosiers held off Purdue 66–63 in the game. Indiana jumped out early and led by as many as six points at 17–11 before Purdue used a 12–1 run to go ahead by six points themselves at 27–21. But Indiana closed the gap and at halftime Purdue led 29–27. After only one lead change in the first half, the second half featured 5 ties and 9 lead changes as the teams battled back and forth. Indiana took the lead for good at 50–49 with 5:36 left, but Purdue never trailed by more than five points and the game wasn't over until Jeff Newton stole Purdue's inbound pass with a second left. Newton scored 16 points to lead the Hoosiers, including 9 crucial points in the final three minutes.

==== 2005: Double overtime ====
On January 15, 2005, Indiana and Purdue faced off in Mackey Arena. It was Keady's final home game of the rivalry. Purdue had led the entire game until Indiana used a 14–0 run to take a four-point lead with twelve minutes remaining in the second half. The teams battled back and forth until David Teague gave Purdue a 55–52 lead with only 25 seconds remaining. However, Indiana's Marshall Strickland tied the game on a three-point play to send the game into overtime.

In the first overtime, the Hoosiers and Boilermakers were tied at 61 when a foul was called on Purdue's Andrew Ford with 0.9 seconds remaining. Strickland hit two free throws to give Indiana the lead. But Purdue heaved a pass to the opposite end of the court where Carl Landry made a layup and was fouled as he shot. After reviewing the call on video replay, the referees ruled that although Landry had released the shot after the buzzer, he had been fouled before time expired. They allowed continuation and counted the basket. However, Landry ended up missing the ensuing free-throw with no time on the clock, and the teams went to double-overtime tied at 63.

In the second overtime, Indiana had a 74–70 lead before Teague hit a three-pointer with 5.7 seconds remaining to pull Purdue within one. Bracey Wright then made one free throw for Indiana, and Purdue's Brandon McKnight missed a last-second heave to make the final score 75–73 in favor of the Hoosiers. This was the first, and thus far only, double-overtime game in the history of the Indiana-Purdue basketball series.

==== 2017: Tie-breaker for Big Ten titles ====
On February 27, 2017, No.16 ranked Purdue faced the defending Big Ten Champion but unranked Hoosiers in Mackey Arena. The previous year Indiana won the Big Ten Regular Season Title to join Purdue with 22 conference titles, tied for the most in conference history. Ninety minutes before game time, the pedestrian areas around Mackey Arena were overflowing with bodies and when the gates opened 60 minutes prior to tip the entire student section was filled in minutes. Caleb Swanigan led the way with 21 points with Dakota Mathias adding 19 points to lead Purdue to a 86–75 victory. This victory clinched a share of the Big Ten Conference Championship for Purdue's 23rd all-time title, which put them alone in first place.

==== 2019: Profane chants game ====
On February 19, 2019, No. 16 ranked Purdue played unranked Indiana at Assembly Hall in what can only be called a rock-fight of a game. The two teams combined for only 94 points, the lowest combined score in the rivalry since 1950. The game was laced with profane chants from the IU fanbase aimed at Purdue's 7'3" Sophomore Matt Haarms, after Haarms was involved in two loose ball battles with De'Ron Davis and received a technical foul on the second scuffle. The chants could be heard clearly on the TV and radio broadcast with the fan base yelling "F--- You Haarms". As the defensive struggle continued, and the game tied at 46 apiece, Purdue put the ball in the hands of their All-American Junior Guard Carsen Edwards who struggled all night from the field. With 5 seconds remaining, his shot went off the back heel and Matt Haarms rose over Indiana's Juwan Morgan and tipped the rebound back in with his left hand for the game winner with 3.1 seconds remaining.

After the game, IU athletic director Fred Glass called his counterpart at Purdue, Mike Bobinski, and apologized for the profane chants. Former Indiana great Alan Henderson also weighed in on the controversy via Twitter to say "we should not hear curse chants at opponents, that's not what Indiana basketball is about." Purdue would go on to win a share of the Big Ten Conference Title for their league-leading 24th title.

=== Results ===
Ranking of the team at the time of the game is shown next to the team name. Purdue leads the all-time head-to-head series with Indiana 129–94.

| Indiana victories | Purdue victories | Tie games |

| No. | Date | Location | Winner | Score |
|---|---|---|---|---|
| 1 | March 2, 1901 | West Lafayette, IN | Purdue | 20–15 |
| 2 | March 15, 1901 | Bloomington, IN | Purdue | 23–19 |
| 3 | February 15, 1902 | Bloomington, IN | Purdue | 32–8 |
| 4 | March 7, 1902 | West Lafayette, IN | Purdue | 71–25 |
| 5 | January 30, 1903 | West Lafayette, IN | Purdue | 52–16 |
| 6 | March 6, 1903 | Bloomington, IN | Purdue | 17–13 |
| 7 | February 12, 1904 | Bloomington, IN | Purdue | 31–18 |
| 8 | March 5, 1904 | West Lafayette, IN | Purdue | 22–21 |
| 9 | January 14, 1905 | West Lafayette, IN | Purdue | 38–20 |
| 10 | February 18, 1905 | Bloomington, IN | Indiana | 29–14 |
| 11 | February 10, 1906 | West Lafayette, IN | Purdue | 27–25 |
| 12 | March 10, 1906 | Bloomington, IN | Indiana | 30–27 |
| 13 | February 7, 1908 | West Lafayette, IN | Indiana | 26–21 |
| 14 | February 26, 1908 | Bloomington, IN | Purdue | 16–14 |
| 15 | February 9, 1909 | Bloomington, IN | Purdue | 28–14 |
| 16 | March 13, 1909 | West Lafayette, IN | Purdue | 30–13 |
| 17 | February 8, 1910 | Bloomington, IN | Purdue | 23–18 |
| 18 | March 1, 1910 | West Lafayette, IN | Purdue | 62–15 |
| 19 | January 31, 1911 | Bloomington, IN | Purdue | 37–33 |
| 20 | March 4, 1911 | West Lafayette, IN | Purdue | 21–16 |
| 21 | February 3, 1912 | Bloomington, IN | Purdue | 54–18 |
| 22 | March 3, 1912 | West Lafayette, IN | Purdue | 45–11 |
| 23 | January 24, 1913 | West Lafayette, IN | Purdue | 34–19 |
| 24 | March 15, 1913 | Bloomington, IN | Purdue | 32–21 |
| 25 | February 9, 1914 | West Lafayette, IN | Purdue | 35–13 |
| 26 | March 3, 1914 | Bloomington, IN | Indiana | 30–28 |
| 27 | February 16, 1915 | Bloomington, IN | Purdue | 15–12 |
| 28 | March 2, 1915 | West Lafayette, IN | Purdue | 26–15 |
| 29 | January 15, 1916 | West Lafayette, IN | Purdue | 26–17 |
| 30 | March 11, 1916 | Bloomington, IN | Indiana | 39–29 |
| 31 | January 28, 1917 | Bloomington, IN | Purdue | 22–15 |
| 32 | February 6, 1917 | West Lafayette, IN | Purdue | 24–18 |
| 33 | January 23, 1920 | Bloomington, IN | Purdue | 17–9 |
| 34 | February 25, 1920 | West Lafayette, IN | Purdue | 31–20 |
| 35 | January 28, 1921 | West Lafayette, IN | Purdue | 27–19 |
| 36 | March 3, 1921 | Bloomington, IN | Purdue | 29–20 |
| 37 | February 11, 1922 | Bloomington, IN | Purdue | 24–19 |
| 38 | February 25, 1922 | West Lafayette, IN | Purdue | 20–9 |
| 39 | January 24, 1923 | West Lafayette, IN | Indiana | 31–26 |
| 40 | March 15, 1923 | Bloomington, IN | Purdue | 31–29 |
| 41 | February 4, 1925 | Bloomington, IN | Indiana | 39–36 |
| 42 | February 27, 1925 | West Lafayette, IN | Purdue | 39–29 |
| 43 | January 23, 1926 | Bloomington, IN | Indiana | 37–34 |
| 44 | February 13, 1926 | West Lafayette, IN | Purdue | 31–29 |
| 45 | January 24, 1928 | West Lafayette, IN | Purdue | 28–25 |
| 46 | February 18, 1928 | Bloomington, IN | Indiana | 40–37 |
| 47 | January 19, 1929 | Bloomington, IN | Purdue | 29–23 |
| 48 | February 18, 1929 | West Lafayette, IN | Purdue | 30–16 |
| 49 | February 7, 1931 | Bloomington, IN | Purdue | 30–23 |
| 50 | February 14, 1931 | West Lafayette, IN | Purdue | 28–15 |
| 51 | January 4, 1932 | West Lafayette, IN | Purdue | 49–30 |
| 52 | February 22, 1932 | Bloomington, IN | Purdue | 42–29 |
| 53 | January 13, 1934 | Bloomington, IN | Purdue | 47–13 |
| 54 | March 3, 1934 | West Lafayette, IN | Purdue | 55–28 |
| 55 | February 18, 1935 | West Lafayette, IN | Purdue | 44–38 |
| 56 | February 25, 1935 | Bloomington, IN | Indiana | 41–35 |
| 57 | January 16, 1937 | Bloomington, IN | Purdue | 41–30 |
| 58 | February 27, 1937 | West Lafayette, IN | Purdue | 69–45 |
| 59 | February 5, 1938 | West Lafayette, IN | Purdue | 38–36 |
| 60 | February 26, 1938 | Bloomington, IN | Purdue | 50–36 |
| 61 | January 16, 1939 | Bloomington, IN | Indiana | 39–36 |
| 62 | February 27, 1939 | West Lafayette, IN | Purdue | 45–34 |
| 63 | February 10, 1940 | Bloomington, IN | Indiana | 46–39 |
| 64 | March 2, 1940 | West Lafayette, IN | Indiana | 51–45 |
| 65 | February 1, 1941 | West Lafayette, IN | Purdue | 40–36 |
| 66 | March 1, 1941 | Bloomington, IN | Indiana | 47–29 |
| 67 | January 12, 1942 | Bloomington, IN | Indiana | 40–39 |
| 68 | January 30, 1943 | Bloomington, IN | Indiana | 53–35 |
| 69 | March 1, 1943 | West Lafayette, IN | Purdue | 41–38 |
| 70 | January 18, 1944 | West Lafayette, IN | Purdue | 62–48 |
| 71 | March 4, 1944 | Bloomington, IN | Indiana | 51–45 |
| 72 | January 17, 1945 | Bloomington, IN | Indiana | 51–50 |
| 73 | February 7, 1945 | West Lafayette, IN | Purdue | 62–48 |
| 74 | January 16, 1946 | West Lafayette, IN | Purdue | 49–38 |
| 75 | February 16, 1946 | Bloomington, IN | Indiana | 57–47 |

| No. | Date | Location | Winner | Score |
|---|---|---|---|---|
| 76 | January 13, 1947 | Bloomington, IN | Indiana | 62–46 |
| 77 | March 3, 1947 | West Lafayette, IN | Indiana | 54–38 |
| 78 | January 5, 1948 | West Lafayette, IN | Purdue | 58–49 |
| 79 | February 28, 1948 | Bloomington, IN | Purdue | 51–49 |
| 80 | January 17, 1949 | Bloomington, IN | Indiana | 56–42 |
| 81 | February 19, 1949 | West Lafayette, IN | Indiana | 56–50 |
| 82 | January 21, 1950 | West Lafayette, IN | #8 Indiana | 49–39 |
| 83 | February 18, 1950 | Bloomington, IN | Indiana | 60–50 |
| 84 | January 20, 1951 | West Lafayette, IN | #6 Indiana | 77–56 |
| 85 | February 24, 1951 | Bloomington, IN | #4 Indiana | 68–53 |
| 86 | January 19, 1952 | Bloomington, IN | #14 Indiana | 82–77 |
| 87 | February 9, 1952 | West Lafayette, IN | #18 Indiana | 93–70 |
| 88 | January 19, 1953 | West Lafayette, IN | #6 Indiana | 88–75 |
| 89 | February 23, 1953 | Bloomington, IN | #2 Indiana | 113–78 |
| 90 | January 11, 1954 | Bloomington, IN | #3 Indiana | 73–67 |
| 91 | February 15, 1954 | West Lafayette, IN | #3 Indiana | 86–50 |
| 92 | February 21, 1955 | Bloomington, IN | Indiana | 75–62 |
| 93 | February 26, 1955 | West Lafayette, IN | Purdue | 92–67 |
| 94 | March 3, 1956 | Bloomington, IN | Purdue | 73–71 |
| 95 | January 12, 1957 | West Lafayette, IN | Purdue | 70–64 |
| 96 | January 6, 1958 | West Lafayette, IN | Purdue | 68–66 |
| 97 | March 1, 1958 | Bloomington, IN | Indiana | 109–95 |
| 98 | January 5, 1959 | Bloomington, IN | Indiana | 77–69 |
| 99 | February 16, 1959 | West Lafayette, IN | #20 Purdue | 94–89 |
| 100 | January 2, 1960 | Bloomington, IN | Purdue | 79–76 |
| 101 | February 13, 1961 | West Lafayette, IN | Purdue | 64–55 |
| 102 | February 10, 1962 | West Lafayette, IN | Purdue | 105–93 |
| 103 | March 3, 1962 | Bloomington, IN | Indiana | 88–71 |
| 104 | January 7, 1963 | Bloomington, IN | Indiana | 85–71 |
| 105 | January 28, 1963 | West Lafayette, IN | Indiana | 74–73 |
| 106 | February 1, 1964 | West Lafayette, IN | Purdue | 87–84 |
| 107 | February 22, 1964 | Bloomington, IN | Indiana | 92–79 |
| 108 | February 22, 1965 | West Lafayette, IN | Purdue | 82–70 |
| 109 | March 6, 1965 | Bloomington, IN | Indiana | 90–79 |
| 110 | February 21, 1966 | West Lafayette, IN | Purdue | 77–68 |
| 111 | March 11, 1967 | Bloomington, IN | Indiana | 95–82 |
| 112 | January 16, 1968 | West Lafayette, IN | Purdue | 89–60 |
| 113 | March 9, 1968 | Bloomington, IN | Purdue | 68–64 |
| 114 | February 18, 1969 | Bloomington, IN | #9 Purdue | 96–95 |
| 115 | March 8, 1969 | West Lafayette, IN | #6 Purdue | 120–76 |
| 116 | February 10, 1970 | West Lafayette, IN | Purdue | 98–80 |
| 117 | February 6, 1971 | Bloomington, IN | Purdue | 85–81 |
| 118 | February 26, 1972 | West Lafayette, IN | Purdue | 70–69 |
| 119 | March 11, 1972 | Bloomington, IN | #20 Indiana | 62–48 |
| 120 | February 10, 1973 | West Lafayette, IN | Purdue | 72–69 |
| 121 | March 10, 1973 | Bloomington, IN | #9 Indiana | 77–72 |
| 122 | March 9, 1974 | Bloomington, IN | #13 Indiana | 80–79 |
| 123 | January 25, 1975 | Bloomington, IN | #1 Indiana | 104–71 |
| 124 | February 22, 1975 | West Lafayette, IN | #1 Indiana | 83–82 |
| 125 | January 19, 1976 | Bloomington, IN | #1 Indiana | 71–67 |
| 126 | February 16, 1976 | West Lafayette, IN | #1 Indiana | 74–71 |
| 127 | January 6, 1977 | Bloomington, IN | Purdue | 80–63 |
| 128 | February 20, 1977 | West Lafayette, IN | Purdue | 86–78 |
| 129 | January 21, 1978 | West Lafayette, IN | Purdue | 77–67 |
| 130 | February 9, 1978 | Bloomington, IN | Indiana | 65–64 |
| 131 | January 6, 1979 | Bloomington, IN | Indiana | 63–54 |
| 132 | March 1, 1979 | West Lafayette, IN | #19 Purdue | 55–48 |
| 133 | March 21, 1979 | New York, NY | Indiana | 53–52 |
| 134 | January 26, 1980 | Bloomington, IN | #16 Indiana | 69–58 |
| 135 | February 2, 1980 | West Lafayette, IN | #17 Purdue | 56–51 |
| 136 | March 13, 1980 | Lexington, KY | #20 Purdue | 76–69 |
| 137 | January 31, 1981 | Bloomington, IN | Indiana | 69–61 |
| 138 | February 7, 1981 | West Lafayette, IN | Purdue | 68–66 |
| 139 | January 23, 1982 | Bloomington, IN | Indiana | 57–55 |
| 140 | February 20, 1982 | West Lafayette, IN | Purdue | 76–65 |
| 141 | January 15, 1983 | West Lafayette, IN | #4 Indiana | 81–78 |
| 142 | March 3, 1983 | Bloomington, IN | #11 Indiana | 64–41 |
| 143 | January 14, 1984 | Bloomington, IN | Purdue | 74–66 |
| 144 | February 29, 1984 | West Lafayette, IN | Indiana | 78–59 |
| 145 | January 24, 1985 | West Lafayette, IN | Purdue | 62–52 |
| 146 | February 23, 1985 | Bloomington, IN | Purdue | 72–63 |
| 147 | January 23, 1986 | Bloomington, IN | Indiana | 71–70 |
| 148 | February 23, 1986 | West Lafayette, IN | Purdue | 85–68 |
| 149 | January 31, 1987 | Bloomington, IN | #4 Indiana | 88–77 |
| 150 | February 26, 1987 | West Lafayette, IN | #6 Purdue | 75–64 |

| No. | Date | Location | Winner | Score |
|---|---|---|---|---|
| 151 | January 30, 1988 | Bloomington, IN | Indiana | 82–79 |
| 152 | February 21, 1988 | West Lafayette, IN | #2 Purdue | 95–85 |
| 153 | January 9, 1989 | West Lafayette, IN | Indiana | 74–73 |
| 154 | February 12, 1989 | Bloomington, IN | #13 Indiana | 64–62 |
| 155 | January 13, 1990 | Bloomington, IN | Purdue | 81–79 |
| 156 | February 19, 1990 | West Lafayette, IN | #12 Purdue | 72–49 |
| 157 | January 14, 1991 | West Lafayette, IN | #3 Indiana | 65–62 |
| 158 | February 10, 1991 | Bloomington, IN | #4 Indiana | 81–63 |
| 159 | January 28, 1992 | Bloomington, IN | #4 Indiana | 109–65 |
| 160 | March 15, 1992 | West Lafayette, IN | Purdue | 61–59 |
| 161 | January 19, 1993 | West Lafayette, IN | #2 Indiana | 74–65 |
| 162 | February 21, 1993 | Bloomington, IN | #1 Indiana | 93–78 |
| 163 | January 18, 1994 | West Lafayette, IN | #12 Purdue | 83–76 |
| 164 | February 19, 1994 | Bloomington, IN | #16 Indiana | 82–80 |
| 165 | January 31, 1995 | West Lafayette, IN | Purdue | 76–66 |
| 166 | February 12, 1995 | Bloomington, IN | Indiana | 82–73 |
| 167 | January 16, 1996 | West Lafayette, IN | #17 Purdue | 74–69 |
| 168 | February 25, 1996 | Bloomington, IN | #7 Purdue | 74–72 |
| 169 | January 18, 1997 | West Lafayette, IN | Purdue | 70–53 |
| 170 | February 18, 1997 | Bloomington, IN | Purdue | 89–87 |
| 171 | January 18, 1998 | Bloomington, IN | Indiana | 94–88 |
| 172 | February 10, 1998 | West Lafayette, IN | #8 Purdue | 94–89 |
| 173 | March 6, 1998 | Chicago, IL | #9 Purdue | 76–71 |
| 174 | January 16, 1999 | West Lafayette, IN | #23 Indiana | 87–76 |
| 175 | February 9, 1999 | Bloomington, IN | #21 Purdue | 86–81 |
| 176 | January 22, 2000 | West Lafayette, IN | Purdue | 83–77 |
| 177 | February 29, 2000 | Bloomington, IN | #14 Indiana | 79–65 |
| 178 | January 23, 2001 | Bloomington, IN | Indiana | 66–55 |
| 179 | March 3, 2001 | West Lafayette, IN | Indiana | 74–58 |
| 180 | January 31, 2002 | Bloomington, IN | Indiana | 66–52 |
| 181 | December 14, 2002 | Indianapolis, IN | #7 Indiana | 66–63 |
| 182 | January 25, 2003 | West Lafayette, IN | Purdue | 69–47 |
| 183 | January 27, 2004 | Bloomington, IN | Indiana | 63–58 |
| 184 | February 14, 2004 | West Lafayette, IN | Purdue | 71–56 |
| 185 | January 15, 2005 | West Lafayette, IN | Indiana | 75–73 |
| 186 | February 22, 2005 | Bloomington, IN | Indiana | 79–62 |
| 187 | January 21, 2006 | Bloomington, IN | #13 Indiana | 62–49 |
| 188 | March 1, 2006 | West Lafayette, IN | Indiana | 70–59 |
| 189 | January 10, 2007 | Bloomington, IN | Indiana | 85–58 |
| 190 | February 15, 2007 | West Lafayette, IN | Purdue | 81–68 |
| 191 | February 19, 2008 | Bloomington, IN | #15 Indiana | 77–68 |
| 192 | February 21, 2009 | West Lafayette, IN | #19 Purdue | 81–67 |
| 193 | February 4, 2010 | Bloomington, IN | #8 Purdue | 78–75 |
| 194 | March 3, 2010 | West Lafayette, IN | #7 Purdue | 74–55 |
| 195 | February 8, 2011 | West Lafayette, IN | #14 Purdue | 67–53 |
| 196 | February 23, 2011 | Bloomington, IN | #8 Purdue | 72–61 |
| 197 | February 4, 2012 | West Lafayette, IN | #18 Indiana | 78–61 |
| 198 | March 4, 2012 | Bloomington, IN | Indiana | 85–74 |
| 199 | January 30, 2013 | West Lafayette, IN | #3 Indiana | 97–60 |
| 200 | February 16, 2013 | Bloomington, IN | #1 Indiana | 83–55 |
| 201 | February 15, 2014 | West Lafayette, IN | Purdue | 82–64 |
| 202 | January 28, 2015 | West Lafayette, IN | Purdue | 83–67 |
| 203 | February 19, 2015 | Bloomington, IN | Purdue | 67–63 |
| 204 | February 20, 2016 | Bloomington, IN | #22 Indiana | 77–73 |
| 205 | February 9, 2017 | Bloomington, IN | #16 Purdue | 69–64 |
| 206 | February 28, 2017 | West Lafayette, IN | #16 Purdue | 86–75 |
| 207 | January 28, 2018 | Bloomington, IN | #3 Purdue | 74–67 |
| 208 | January 19, 2019 | West Lafayette, IN | Purdue | 70–55 |
| 209 | February 19, 2019 | Bloomington, IN | #15 Purdue | 48–46 |
| 210 | February 8, 2020 | Bloomington, IN | Purdue | 74–62 |
| 211 | February 27, 2020 | West Lafayette, IN | Purdue | 57–49 |
| 212 | January 14, 2021 | Bloomington, IN | Purdue | 81–69 |
| 213 | March 6, 2021 | West Lafayette, IN | #23 Purdue | 67–58 |
| 214 | January 20, 2022 | Bloomington, IN | Indiana | 68–65 |
| 215 | March 5, 2022 | West Lafayette, IN | #8 Purdue | 69–67 |
| 216 | February 4, 2023 | Bloomington, IN | #21 Indiana | 79–74 |
| 217 | February 25, 2023 | West Lafayette, IN | #17 Indiana | 79–71 |
| 218 | January 16, 2024 | Bloomington, IN | #2 Purdue | 87–66 |
| 219 | February 10, 2024 | West Lafayette, IN | #2 Purdue | 79–59 |
| 220 | January 31, 2025 | West Lafayette, IN | #10 Purdue | 81–76 |
| 221 | February 23, 2025 | Bloomington, IN | Indiana | 73–58 |
| 222 | January 27, 2026 | Bloomington, IN | Indiana | 72–67 |
| 223 | February 20, 2026 | West Lafayette, IN | #7 Purdue | 93–64 |
Series: Purdue leads 129–94

By decade:

| Indiana advantage | Purdue advantage | Tie |

| Decade | Indiana | Purdue |
|---|---|---|
| 1900s | 3 | 13 |
| 1910s | 2 | 14 |
| 1920s | 4 | 12 |
| 1930s | 2 | 12 |
| 1940s | 12 | 7 |
| 1950s | 13 | 5 |
| 1960s | 6 | 10 |
| 1970s | 10 | 8 |
| 1980s | 11 | 10 |
| 1990s | 9 | 12 |
| 2000s | 12 | 5 |
| 2010s | 5 | 12 |
| 2020s | 5 | 9 |
| Total | 94 | 129 |

== Football ==
Football Comparison
| | Indiana | Purdue |
|---|---|---|
| Big Ten Championships | 3 | 12 |
| Bowl Game Appearances | 15 | 21 |
| Playoff Appearances | 2 | 0 |
| Claimed National Titles | 1 | 0 |
| Unclaimed National Titles | 0 | 1 |
| Consensus All-Americans | 9 | 22 |

Indiana and Purdue first met in football in 1891. The rivalry has been renewed annually during every peacetime season since then, except when the 1903 game was canceled due to 14 players of the Purdue team dying in a railroad accident the morning of the game. Purdue leads the all-time series 77–42–6. Like many rivalry games, the game is played during the final week of the college football season.

When the Big Ten expanded to 14 teams in 2014 and the conference realigned into geographically based divisions, Indiana and Purdue were placed in opposite divisions (respectively East and West). The Indiana–Purdue game was the only protected cross-division rivalry in that alignment, ensuring that the Old Oaken Bucket will still be contested every year. The Old Oaken Bucket game continued to be a protected rivalry after the conference expanded to 18 teams in 2023.

== Other sports ==
An official rivalry cup, the Indiana National Guard Governor's Cup, was created in 2001. As of the 2018–19 season, Indiana has claimed the cup fourteen times and Purdue has won seven. The schools have tied twice.

In addition to the Old Oaken Bucket in football, the Monon Spike in volleyball was introduced in 1981 and references the historic Monon Railroad. In women's basketball there is the Barn Burner Trophy, introduced during the 1993–94 season, and women's soccer features the Golden Boot, introduced in 2002.

=== Men's soccer ===
The two programs played each other in men's soccer from 1973 when Indiana began fielding a men's soccer program until 1985, when Purdue disbanded their program.

| Indiana victories | Purdue victories |

| No. | Date | Location | Winner | Score |
|---|---|---|---|---|
| 1 | October 26, 1973 | West Lafayette, IN | Indiana | 6–0 |
| 2 | September 27, 1974 | Bloomington, IN | Indiana | 7–1 |
| 3 | September 26, 1975 | Bloomington, IN | Indiana | 3–0 |
| 4 | November 6, 1977 | Bloomington, IN | Indiana | 7–0 |
| 5 | November 8, 1978 | West Lafayette, IN | Indiana | 8–0 |
| 6 | September 9, 1979 | Bloomington, IN | Indiana | 5–0 |
| 7 | September 11, 1980 | West Lafayette, IN | Indiana | 10–0 |

| No. | Date | Location | Winner | Score |
|---|---|---|---|---|
| 8 | September 22, 1981 | Bloomington, IN | Indiana | 6–0 |
| 9 | October 6, 1982 | Bloomington, IN | Indiana | 4–0 |
| 10 | September 28, 1983 | Bloomington, IN | Indiana | 8–0 |
| 11 | November 3, 1984 | Bloomington, IN | Indiana | 4–1 |
| 12 | September 25, 1985 | Bloomington, IN | Indiana | 8–1 |
Series: Indiana leads 12–0
