= Buckner Fieldhouse =

Multi-purpose arena

Coordinates: 61°15′28″N 149°40′58″W

Buckner Fieldhouse is a 3,500-seat multi-purpose arena in Fort Richardson, Alaska, near Anchorage.

From 1978 to 1982, it was home to the Great Alaska Shootout basketball tournament. It was replaced as the Shootout venue when the Sullivan Arena opened in 1983.
