= 1978–79 NCAA Division I men's basketball rankings =

- Season: 1978–79
- NCAA Tournament: 1979
- Preseason No. 1: Duke
- NCAA Tournament Champions: Michigan State
NCAA Division I men's basketball rankings
| |

The 1978–79 NCAA Division I men's basketball rankings was made up of two human polls, the AP Poll and the Coaches Poll, in addition to various other preseason polls.

== Legend ==
| | Increase in ranking |
| | Decrease in ranking |
| | New to rankings from previous week |
| Italics | Number of first place votes |
| (#–#) | Win–loss record |
| т | Tied with team above or below also with this symbol |

== AP Poll ==
| | Preseason | Week 2 Nov. 28 | Week 3 Dec. 4 | Week 4 Dec. 11 | Week 5 Dec. 18 | Week 6 Dec. 25 | Week 7 Jan. 3 | Week 8 Jan. 8 | Week 9 Jan. 15 | Week 10 Jan. 22 | Week 11 Jan. 29 | Week 12 Feb. 5 | Week 13 Feb. 12 | Week 14 Feb. 19 | Week 15 Feb. 26 | Week 16 Mar. 5 | Final Mar. 12 | |
|---|---|---|---|---|---|---|---|---|---|---|---|---|---|---|---|---|---|---|
| 1. | Duke | Duke (1–0) | Duke (4–0) | Duke (5–0) | Duke (6–0) | Duke (6–0) | Michigan State (7–1) | Michigan State (9–1) | Notre Dame (8–1) | Notre Dame (11–1) | Notre Dame (12–2) | Notre Dame (15–2) | Indiana State (23–0) | UCLA (20–3) | Indiana State (24–0) | Indiana State (29–0) | Indiana State (30–0) | 1. |
| 2. | UCLA | UCLA (3–0) | UCLA (3–0) | Notre Dame (4–0) | Notre Dame (4–0) | Notre Dame (4–0) | Notre Dame (5–1) | Notre Dame (6–1) | North Carolina (12–2) | North Carolina (14–2) | Indiana State (18–0) | Indiana State (20–0) | UCLA (18–3) | Indiana State (24–0) | Notre Dame (22–3) | UCLA (23–4) | UCLA (24–4) | 2. |
| 3. | Notre Dame | Notre Dame (0–0) | Notre Dame (2–0) | Michigan State (2–0) | UCLA (4–1) | UCLA (6–1) | North Carolina (8–1) | North Carolina (10–1) | UCLA (11–2) | Indiana State (14–0) | Duke (14–3) | Duke (16–3) | Notre Dame (17–3) | Notre Dame (19–3) | UCLA (21–4) | North Carolina (23–5) | Michigan State (22–6) | 3. |
| 4. | Louisville | Kansas (0–0) | Michigan State (1–0) | Louisville (5–1) | NC State (7–1) | Michigan State (4–1) | Illinois (12–0) | Illinois (14–0) | Illinois (15–1) | Michigan State (11–3) | North Carolina (15–3) | UCLA (16–3) | North Carolina (18–4) | North Carolina (20–4) | Michigan State (20–5) | Michigan State (21–6) | Notre Dame (23–5) | 4. |
| 5. | Kansas | Louisville (3–1) | Kansas (3–0) | UCLA (3–1) | Michigan State (3–1) | North Carolina (6–1) | Duke (6–2) | LSU (10–0) | Indiana State (14–0) | Louisville (15–3) | UCLA (14–3) | Louisville (19–3) | Duke (17–4) | LSU (21–3) | Duke (20–6) | Notre Dame (22–5) | Arkansas (24–4) | 5. |
| 6. | Texas | NC State (3–0) | Michigan (2–0) | Kentucky (3–0) | North Carolina (5–1) | Illinois (9–0) | UCLA (7–2) | UCLA (9–2) | Michigan State (9–3) | UCLA (12–3) | Louisville (17–3) | North Carolina (16–4) | LSU (20–3) | Duke (19–5) | Syracuse (24–2) | Duke (22–7) | DePaul (23–5) | 6. |
| 7. | Michigan State | Michigan State (0–0) | Louisville (3–1) | NC State (6–1) | Kansas (5–1) | LSU (7–0) | LSU (8–0) | Duke (9–2) | Louisville (12–3) | Duke (12–3) | Ohio State (13–4) | Syracuse (18–2) | Syracuse (20–2) | Michigan State (18–5) | North Carolina (21–5) | Arkansas (23–4) | LSU (23–5) | 7. |
| 8. | Michigan | Michigan (0–0) | NC State (4–1) | Kansas (4–1) | Syracuse (6–0) | Michigan (4–1) | NC State (8–2) | NC State (11–2) | Duke (10–3) | Illinois (16–2) | Syracuse (18–2) | LSU (19–3) | Michigan State (16–5) | Syracuse (21–2) | LSU (22–4) | DePaul (22–4) | Syracuse (26–3) | 8. |
| 9. | Syracuse | Syracuse (1–0) | Syracuse (4–0) | Michigan (3–1) | Michigan (4–1) | NC State (7–2) | Kentucky (5–2) | Indiana State (11–0) | LSU (12–2) | LSU (13–2) | Georgetown (16–2) | Marquette (16–3) | Louisville (21–4) | Marquette (19–4) | Arkansas (21–4) | LSU (22–5) | North Carolina (23–6) | 9. |
| 10. | Indiana | Kentucky (0–0) | Kentucky (2–0) | Syracuse (5–0) | LSU (6–0) | Louisville (7–2) | Texas A&M (11–2) | Arkansas (9–0) | Georgetown (12–2) | Ohio State (11–4) | LSU (15–3) | Michigan State (14–5) | Marquette (17–4) | Arkansas (20–4) | Marquette (19–5) | Syracuse (25–3) | Marquette (22–6) | 10. |
| 11. | Kentucky | LSU (1–0) | USC (2–0) | LSU (5–0) | Kentucky (3–1) | Indiana State (8–0) | Indiana State (9–0) | Texas A&M (11–2) | Arkansas (10–2) | Georgetown (14–2) | Texas (15–4) | Texas A&M (20–4) | Arkansas (18–4) | Texas (20–5) | Iowa (19–6) | Georgetown (24–4) | Duke (22–8) | 11. |
| 12. | NC State | USC (0–0) | LSU (4–0) | USC (3–0) | Louisville (6–2) | Texas A&M (9–2) | Georgetown (9–1) | Louisville (10–3) | Syracuse (12–2) | Syracuse (14–2) | Marquette (14–3) | Texas (16–5) | Texas (18–5) | Iowa (18–5) | Temple (22–3) | Marquette (21–6) | San Francisco (22–6) | 12. |
| 13. | USC | Texas (0–1) | Texas (3–1) | North Carolina (4–1) | Marquette (5–0) | Kentucky (4–2) | Michigan (6–2) | Marquette (10–1) | Marquette (11–2) | Marquette (13–2) | Alabama (13–4) | Ohio State (13–6) | Purdue (19–5) | Louisville (22–6) | Louisville (23–6) | Temple (25–3) | Louisville (24–7) | 13. |
| 14. | LSU | North Carolina (0–0) | North Carolina (3–1) | Marquette (4–0) | Georgetown (6–0) | UNLV (8–1) | Arkansas (7–0) | Georgetown (10–2) | NC State (11–4) | Texas A&M (15–3) | Illinois (16–4) | Arkansas (15–4) | Iowa (16–5) | Ohio State (16–7) | Texas (20–6) | Iowa (20–7) | Penn (23–5) | 14. |
| 15. | Rutgers | San Francisco (1–0) | UNLV (3–0) | UNLV (3–0) | Illinois (7–0) | Georgetown (7–1) | Long Beach State (8–0) | Kansas (8–3) | Texas A&M (13–3) | Arkansas (11–3) | Michigan State (11–5) | Iowa (15–4) | Temple (19–3) | Temple (20–3) | DePaul (20–4) | Texas (21–7) | Purdue (24–7) | 15. |
| 16. | North Carolina | Rutgers (0–0) | Marquette (2–0) | Georgetown (5–0) | Indiana State (8–0) | Marquette (6–1) | Louisville (8–3) | Michigan (7–3) | Ohio State (9–1) | Temple (12–1) | Texas A&M (17–4) | Alabama (13–5) | Georgetown (18–4) | Detroit (20–4) | Georgetown (22–4) | Purdue (23–7) | Oklahoma (21–9) | 16. |
| 17. | San Francisco | Marquette (0–0) | San Francisco (3–1) | Texas (4–2) | Texas A&M (8–1) | Long Beach State (7–0) | Marquette (8–1) | Kentucky (9–4) | Temple (12–1) | Texas (11–4) | Maryland (14–5) | Vanderbilt (15–4) | Ohio State (16–7) | Georgetown (20–4) | Ohio State (17–8) | Detroit (22–5) | St. John's (20–10) | 17. |
| 18. | Marquette | UNLV (1–0) | Rutgers (2–1) | Illinois (6–0) | UNLV (5–1) | Kansas (5–3) | Mississippi State (8–0) | Temple (11–0) | Alabama (10–4) | Alabama (11–4) | Temple (15–3) | Georgetown (16–4) | Detroit (18–4) | Purdue (20–6) | Detroit (21–5) | Louisville (23–7) | Rutgers (22–8) | 18. |
| 19. | Alabama | Maryland (1–0) | Maryland (2–2) | San Francisco (5–2) | Texas (5–2) | Syracuse (6–2) | Kansas (8–3) | Long Beach State (8–2) | Maryland (11–4) | Vanderbilt (12–2) | Arkansas (13–4) | Temple (17–3) | Vanderbilt (16–5) | Vanderbilt (18–6) | Purdue (21–7) | San Francisco (21–6) | Toledo (22–7) | 19. |
| 20. | UNLV | Indiana (1–2) | Georgetown (3–0) | Indiana State (6–0) | USC (6–2) | Arkansas (6–0) | Maryland (10–3) | Syracuse (9–2) | Kansas (9–4) | NC State (11–6) | Vanderbilt (14–3) | Illinois (17–5) | Alabama (15–7) | DePaul (18–4) | San Francisco (21–6) | Tennessee (20–11) | Iowa (20–8) | 20. |
| | Preseason | Week 2 Nov. 28 | Week 3 Dec. 4 | Week 4 Dec. 11 | Week 5 Dec. 18 | Week 6 Dec. 25 | Week 7 Jan. 3 | Week 8 Jan. 8 | Week 9 Jan. 15 | Week 10 Jan. 22 | Week 11 Jan. 29 | Week 12 Feb. 5 | Week 13 Feb. 12 | Week 14 Feb. 19 | Week 15 Feb. 26 | Week 16 Mar. 5 | Final Mar. 12 | |
| | | Dropped: Alabama (1–1) | Dropped: Indiana (2–2) | Dropped: Rutgers (3–2); Maryland (3–2) | Dropped: San Francisco (6–3) | Dropped: Texas (5–2); USC (6–3) | Dropped: UNLV (8–3); Syracuse (8–2) | Dropped: Mississippi State (8–2); Maryland (10–3) | Dropped: Michigan (7–5); Kentucky (10–5); Long Beach State (9–4) | Dropped: Maryland (11–6); Kansas (10–5) | Dropped: NC State (13–6) | Dropped: Maryland (15–6) | Dropped: Texas A&M (20–6) | Dropped: Alabama (16–8) | Dropped: Vanderbilt (18–8) | Dropped: Ohio State (17–10) | Dropped: Georgetown (24–5); Temple (25–3); Texas (21–7); Detroit (22–5); Tennessee (20–11) | |

== UPI Poll ==
| | Preseason Pre | Week 2 Dec. 12 | Week 3 Dec. 19 | Week 4 Dec. 26 | Week 5 Jan. 3 | Week 6 Jan. 9 | Week 7 Jan. 16 | Week 8 Jan. 23 | Week 9 Jan. 30 | Week 10 Feb. 6 | Week 11 Feb. 13 | Week 12 Feb. 20 | Week 13 Feb. 27 | Final Mar. 6 | |
|---|---|---|---|---|---|---|---|---|---|---|---|---|---|---|---|
| 1. | Duke | Duke (5–0) | Duke (6–0) | Duke (6–0) | Michigan State (7–1) | Michigan State (9–1) | Notre Dame (8–1) | Notre Dame (11–1) | Notre Dame (12–2) | Notre Dame (15–2) | UCLA (18–3) | UCLA (20–3) | Indiana State (24–0) | Indiana State (29–0) | 1. |
| 2. | UCLA | Notre Dame (4–0) | Notre Dame (4–0) | Notre Dame (4–0) | Notre Dame (5–1) | Notre Dame (6–1) | Illinois (15–1) | North Carolina (14–2) | Indiana State (18–0) | Indiana State (20–0) | Indiana State (23–0) | Indiana State (24–0) | Notre Dame (22–3) | UCLA (23–4) | 2. |
| 3. | Notre Dame | Michigan State (2–0) | UCLA (4–1) | UCLA (6–1) | Illinois (12–0) | Illinois (14–0) | North Carolina (12–2) | Indiana State (14–0) | UCLA (14–3) | UCLA (16–3) | Notre Dame (17–3) | Notre Dame (19–3) | UCLA (21–4) | North Carolina (23–5) | 3. |
| 4. | Michigan State | Louisville (5–1) | Michigan State (3–1) | Michigan State (4–1) | North Carolina (8–1) | North Carolina (10–1) | UCLA (11–2) | Michigan State (11–3) | Duke (14–3) | Duke (16–3) | North Carolina (18–4) | North Carolina (20–4) | Michigan State (20–5) | Michigan State (21–6) | 4. |
| 5. | Kansas т | UCLA (3–1) | NC State (7–1) | Illinois (9–0) | UCLA (7–2) | LSU (10–0) | Indiana State (14–0) | Louisville (15–3) | Louisville (17–3) | Louisville (19–3) | LSU (20–3) | LSU (21–3) | Syracuse (24–2) | Notre Dame (22–5) | 5. |
| 6. | Louisville т | Kentucky (3–0) | North Carolina (5–1) | North Carolina (6–1) | LSU (8–0) | UCLA (9–2) | Michigan State (9–3) | Duke (12–3) | North Carolina (15–3) | North Carolina (16–4) | Duke (17–4) | Syracuse (21–2) | Duke (20–6) | Arkansas (23–4) | 6. |
| 7. | Texas | NC State (6–1) | Michigan (4–1) | Michigan (4–1) | Duke (6–2) | Duke (9–2) | Louisville (12–3) | UCLA (12–3) | Ohio State (13–4) | LSU (19–3) | Syracuse (20–2) | Duke (19–5) | North Carolina (21–5) | Duke (22–7) | 7. |
| 8. | Michigan | Kansas (4–1) | Kansas (5–1) | LSU (7–0) | Kentucky (5–2) | NC State (11–2) | LSU (12–2) | Illinois (16–2) | Syracuse (18–2) | Marquette (16–3) | Michigan State (16–5) | Michigan State (18–5) | LSU (22–4) | DePaul (22–4) | 8. |
| 9. | NC State | Michigan (3–1) | Syracuse (6–0) | Louisville (7–2) | Indiana State (9–0) | Indiana State (11–0) | Duke (10–3) | Ohio State (11–4) | Marquette (14–3) | Michigan State (14–5) | Louisville (21–4) | Marquette (19–4) | Arkansas (21–4) | LSU (22–5) | 9. |
| 10. | USC | LSU (5–0) | LSU (6–0) | Texas A&M (9–2) | NC State (8–2) | Arkansas (9–0) | Marquette (11–2) | LSU (13–2) | Georgetown (16–2) | Syracuse (18–2) | Marquette (17–4) | Texas (20–5) | Iowa (19–6) | Syracuse (25–3) | 10. |
| 11. | Indiana | Syracuse (5–0) | Louisville (6–2) | Indiana State (8–0) | Long Beach State (8–0) | Marquette (10–1) | Ohio State (9–4) | Marquette (13–2) | Texas (15–4) | Texas A&M (20–4) | Arkansas (18–4) | Iowa (18–5) | DePaul (20–4) | Iowa (20–7) | 11. |
| 12. | North Carolina | North Carolina (4–1) | Kentucky (3–1) | Georgetown (7–1) | Michigan (6–2) | Texas A&M (11–2) | Temple (12–1) | Georgetown (14–2) | LSU (15–3) | Ohio State (13–6) | Texas (18–5) | Arkansas (20–4) | Marquette (19–5) | Georgetown (24–4) | 12. |
| 13. | Syracuse | USC (3–0) | Marquette (5–0) | Long Beach State (7–0) | Mississippi State (8–0) | Louisville (10–3) | Arkansas (10–2) | Syracuse (14–2) | Michigan State (11–5) | Iowa (15–4) | Purdue (19–5) | Ohio State (16–7) | Temple (22–3) | Marquette (21–6) | 13. |
| 14. | Kentucky | Marquette (4–0) | Georgetown (6–0) | Kansas (5–3) | Texas A&M (11–2) | Kansas (8–3) | Georgetown (12–2) | Texas A&M (15–3) | Texas A&M (17–4) | Arkansas (15–4) | Temple (19–3) | Louisville (22–6) | Texas (20–6) | Purdue (23–7) | 14. |
| 15. | Alabama | Georgetown (5–0) | Indiana State (8–0) | Kentucky (4–2) | Arkansas (7–0) | Temple (11–0) | Syracuse (12–2) | Temple (12–1) | Alabama (13–4) | Texas (16–5) | Iowa (16–5) | Temple (20–3) | Georgetown (22–4) | Texas (21–7) | 15. |
| 16. | San Francisco | Indiana State (6–0) | Illinois (7–0) | Washington State (7–0) | Louisville (8–3) | Georgetown (10–2) | Alabama (10–4) | Texas (11–4) | Vanderbilt (14–3) | Vanderbilt (15–4) | Georgetown (18–4) | Georgetown (20–4) | Louisville (23–6) | Temple (25–3) | 16. |
| 17. | LSU | Texas (4–2) | Long Beach State (6–0) | Marquette (6–1) | Kansas (8–3) | Long Beach State (8–2) | Texas A&M (13–3) | Vanderbilt (12–2) | Illinois (16–4) | Temple (17–3) | Vanderbilt (16–5) | Purdue (20–6) | Ohio State (17–8) | San Francisco (21–6) | 17. |
| 18. | Rutgers | Long Beach State (4–0) | Texas A&M (8–1) | Syracuse (6–2) | Georgetown (9–1) | Syracuse (9–2) | NC State (11–4) | Arkansas (11–3) | Temple (15–3) | Purdue (17–5) | Ohio State (16–7) т | Detroit (20–4) | Purdue (21–7) | Tennessee (20–11) | 18. |
| 19. | Minnesota | Illinois (6–0) | Texas (5–2) | Maryland (7–2) | Marquette (8–1) | USC (6–3) | Kansas (9–4) | NC State (11–6) | Weber State (19–4) | Georgetown (16–4) т | Texas A&M (20–6) т | Vanderbilt (18–6) | San Francisco (21–6) | Louisville (23–7) | 19. |
| 20. | Marquette | Arkansas (2–0) | Arkansas (4–0) | Texas (5–2) | Maryland (9–2) | Michigan (7–3) | USC (9–4) | Alabama (11–4) | Purdue (15–5) | USC (13–6) т | Detroit (18–4) | DePaul (18–4) | Detroit (21–5) | Detroit (22–5) | 20. |
| | Preseason Pre | Week 2 Dec. 12 | Week 3 Dec. 19 | Week 4 Dec. 26 | Week 5 Jan. 3 | Week 6 Jan. 9 | Week 7 Jan. 16 | Week 8 Jan. 23 | Week 9 Jan. 30 | Week 10 Feb. 6 | Week 11 Feb. 13 | Week 12 Feb. 20 | Week 13 Feb. 27 | Final Mar. 6 | |
| | | Dropped: Indiana (3–3); Alabama (3–2); San Francisco (3–2); Rutgers (2–2); Minnesota (2–2) | Dropped: USC (6–2) | Dropped: NC State (7–2); Arkansas (6–0) | Dropped: Washington State (9–1); Syracuse (8–2); Texas (6–3) | Dropped: Kentucky (9–4); Mississippi State (8–2); Maryland (10–3) | Dropped: Long Beach State (9–4); Michigan (7–5) | Dropped: Kansas (9–6); USC (10–6) | Dropped: Arkansas (13–4); NC State (13–6) | Dropped: Alabama (13–5); Illinois (17–5); Weber State (20–4) | Dropped: USC (13–8) | Dropped: Texas A&M (21–7) | Dropped: Vanderbilt (18–8) | Dropped: Ohio State (17–10) | |
