= 1979 National Invitation Tournament =

Annual NCAA college basketball competition

- Season: 1978–79
- Teams: 24
- Finals site: Madison Square Garden, New York City
- Champions: Indiana Hoosiers (1st title)
- Runner-up: Purdue Boilermakers (2nd title game)
- Semifinalists: Alabama Crimson Tide (3rd semifinal); Ohio State Buckeyes (1st semifinal)
- Winning coach: Bob Knight (1st title)
- MVP: Butch Carter & Ray Tolbert (Indiana)

The 1979 National Invitation Tournament was the 1979 edition of the annual NCAA college basketball competition. Indiana University defeated their rival Purdue University 53–52 in the championship game. Purdue appeared in the 1980 NCAA Men's Final Four while Indiana won the national championship at the 1981 NCAA Men's Final Four.

== Selected teams ==
Below is a list of the 24 teams selected for the tournament.

- Alabama
- Alcorn State
- Central Michigan
- Clemson
- Dayton
- Holy Cross
- Indiana
- Kentucky
- Maryland
- Mississippi State
- Nevada
- New Mexico
- Northeast Louisiana
- Ohio State
- Old Dominion
- Oregon State
- Purdue
- Rhode Island
- Saint Joseph's
- St. Bonaventure
- Texas A&M
- Texas Tech
- Virginia
- Wagner

== Brackets ==
Below are the three first round brackets, along with the four-team championship bracket.

First Round
Indiana	78
Texas Tech	59
Alcorn State	80
Mississippi State	78
Maryland	67
Rhode Island	65
Ohio State	80
Saint Joseph's	66

Second Round
Indiana	72
Alcorn State	68
Maryland	72
Ohio State	79

Quarterfinals
Indiana	64
Ohio State	55

- Indiana and Ohio State received byes to the Semifinals.

First Round
Purdue	97
Central Michigan	80
Dayton	105
Holy Cross	81
Clemson	68
Kentucky	67
Old Dominion	83
Wagner	81

Second Round
Purdue	84
Dayton	70
Clemson	59
Old Dominion	61

Quarterfinals
Purdue	67
Old Dominion	59

First Round
Nevada	62
Oregon State	61
Texas A&M	79
New Mexico	68
Alabama	98
St. Bonaventure	89
Virginia	79
Northeast Louisiana	78

Second Round
Nevada	64
Texas A&M	67
Alabama	90
Virginia	88

Quarterfinals
Texas A&M	68
Alabama	72

=== Semifinals & finals ===
Semifinals
Indiana	64
Ohio State	55
Purdue	87
Alabama	68

Finals
Indiana	53
Purdue	52

Third place game
Ohio State	86
Alabama	96

== See also ==
- 1979 NCAA Division I basketball tournament
- 1979 NCAA Division II basketball tournament
- 1979 NCAA Division III basketball tournament
- 1979 NAIA basketball tournament
- 1979 National Women's Invitational Tournament
