= 1978–79 Syracuse Orangemen basketball team =

American college basketball season

1978–79 Syracuse Orangemen basketball

NCAA Tournament, Second Round, L 76–84 vs. Penn
- Conference: Independent

Ranking
- Coaches: No. 10
- AP: No. 8
- Record: 26–4
- Head coach: Jim Boeheim (3rd season)
- Assistant coach: Bernie Fine (3rd season)
- Home arena: Manley Field House

1978–79 NCAA Division I men's basketball independents standings
	Conf.				Overall
Team	W		L	PCT	W		L	PCT
No. 8 Syracuse		–		–	26	–	4	.867
Georgetown		–		–	24	–	5	.828
No. 6 DePaul		–		–	26	–	6	.813
No. 4 Notre Dame		–		–	24	–	6	.800
VCU		–		–	20	–	5	.800
Iona		–		–	23	–	6	.793
Detroit		–		–	22	–	6	.786
Tennessee State		–		–	20	–	6	.769
Old Dominion		–		–	23	–	7	.767
No. 10 Marquette		–		–	22	–	7	.759
Wagner		–		–	21	–	7	.750
Connecticut		–		–	21	–	8	.724
UNLV		–		–	21	–	8	.724
UNC Wilmington		–		–	19	–	8	.704
Boston College		–		–	21	–	9	.700
James Madison		–		–	18	–	8	.692
Rhode Island		–		–	20	–	9	.690
George Mason		–		–	17	–	8	.680
St. Bonaventure		–		–	19	–	9	.679
Illinois State		–		–	20	–	10	.667
St. John's		–		–	21	–	11	.656
Dayton		–		–	19	–	10	.655
Boston University		–		–	17	–	9	.654
Fairfield		–		–	17	–	9	.654
Georgia Tech		–		–	17	–	9	.654
Oral Roberts		–		–	17	–	10	.630
Holy Cross		–		–	17	–	11	.607
Seton Hall		–		–	16	–	11	.593
Cleveland State		–		–	15	–	10	.600
East Tennessee State		–		–	16	–	11	.593
Maine		–		–	14	–	10	.583
UAB		–		–	15	–	11	.577
Army		–		–	14	–	11	.560
Denver		–		–	15	–	12	.556
South Carolina		–		–	15	–	12	.556
Stetson		–		–	15	–	12	.556
Siena		–		–	14	–	12	.538
St. Francis (NY)		–		–	14	–	12	.538
Navy		–		–	13	–	12	.520
Xavier		–		–	14	–	13	.519
Northeastern		–		–	13	–	13	.500
Saint Francis (PA)		–		–	13	–	13	.500
Robert Morris		–		–	13	–	14	.481
Southern Miss		–		–	13	–	14	.481
Air Force		–		–	12	–	13	.480
Long Island University		–		–	12	–	13	.480
Canisius		–		–	12	–	14	.462
Colgate		–		–	12	–	14	.462
Evansville		–		–	13	–	16	.448
East Carolina		–		–	12	–	15	.444
Loyola-Chicago		–		–	12	–	15	.444
Butler		–		–	11	–	16	.407
North Texas State		–		–	11	–	16	.407
Saint Peter's		–		–	10	–	15	.400
Campbell		–		–	10	–	16	.385
New Hampshire		–		–	10	–	16	.385
Providence		–		–	10	–	16	.385
Richmond		–		–	10	–	16	.385
Hawaii		–		–	10	–	17	.370
William & Mary		–		–	9	–	17	.346
Georgia Southern		–		–	9	–	18	.333
Fairleigh Dickinson		–		–	8	–	18	.308
Wisconsin-Milwaukee		–		–	8	–	18	.308
Vermont		–		–	8	–	18	.308
Northwestern State		–		–	7	–	19	.269
Fordham		–		–	7	–	22	.241
Catholic		–		–	6	–	20	.231
Arkansas-Little Rock		–		–	6	–	20	.231
Manhattan		–		–	6	–	20	.231
Niagara		–		–	6	–	20	.231
Portland State		–		–	6	–	21	.222
Baltimore		–		–	4	–	20	.167
Valparaiso		–		–	4	–	21	.160
Baptist		–		–	2	–	25	.074
Rankings from AP Poll

The 1978–79 Syracuse Orangemen men's basketball team represented Syracuse University during the 1978–79 NCAA men's basketball season. The team finished with a 26–4 record and qualified for the 1979 NCAA Tournament. Syracuse won their first game against Connecticut 89–81. But they lost to Pennsylvania in the second round 84–76.

== Personnel ==
1978–79 Syracuse Orange men's basketball team
Players
Coaches

Pos.	#	Name	Height	Weight	Year	Hometown
C	50	Roosevelt Bouie	6 ft 11 in (2.11 m)	225 lb (102 kg)	Jr	Kendall, New York
F	20	Dan Boyle	6 ft 5 in (1.96 m)	—	Fr	Herkimer, New York
PG	10	Hal Cohen	6 ft 0 in (1.83 m)	170 lb (77 kg)	Jr	Canton, New York
G	30	Mark Cubit	6 ft 3 in (1.91 m)	175 lb (79 kg)	RS Sr	Sharon Hill, Pennsylvania
F	53	Ken Davis (W)	6 ft 6 in (1.98 m)	—	So	Utica, New York
	35	Ed Gooding	6 ft 7 in (2.01 m)	195 lb (88 kg)	Fr	New York, New York
G	32	Rick Harmon	6 ft 4 in (1.93 m)	—	Fr	Wildwood, New Jersey
G	23	Marty Headd	6 ft 2 in (1.88 m)	180 lb (82 kg)	So	Syracuse, New York
F	32	Chris Jerebko	6 ft 6 in (1.98 m)	200 lb (91 kg)	So	Athol Springs, New York
G	22	Eddie Moss	6 ft 2 in (1.88 m)	180 lb (82 kg)	So	Rosedale, New York
F	55	Louis Orr	6 ft 8 in (2.03 m)	175 lb (79 kg)	Jr	Cincinnati, Ohio
F	42	Ron Payton	6 ft 5 in (1.96 m)	205 lb (93 kg)	Fr	Trenton, New Jersey
C	44	Danny Schayes	6 ft 11 in (2.11 m)	235 lb (107 kg)	So	Syracuse, New York
F	33	Dale Shackleford (C)	6 ft 6 in (1.98 m)	200 lb (91 kg)	Sr	Utica, New York

Head coach

- Jim Boeheim

Assistant coach(es)

Legend

- (C) Team captain
- (S) Suspended
- (I) Ineligible
- (W) Walk-on
- Injured
- Current redshirt

Roster

== Schedule and results ==
Date time, TV	Rank^{#}	Opponent^{#}	Result	Record	Site city, state
Regular Season
Nov 25, 1978*	No. 9	Whittier College	W 102–77	1–0	Manley Field House; Syracuse, New York
Nov 29, 1978*	No. 9	North Carolina A&T	W 102–77	2–0	Manley Field House; Syracuse, New York
Dec 1, 1978*	No. 9	Western Michigan; Carrier Classic	W 93–71	3–0	Manley Field House; Syracuse, New York
Dec 2, 1978*	No. 9	Iona; Carrier Classic	W 89–76	4–0	Manley Field House; Syracuse, New York
Dec 9, 1978*	No. 9	Rhode Island	W 70–68	5–0	Manley Field House; Syracuse, New York
Dec 16, 1978*	No. 9	at Penn State	W 67–50	6–0	Rec Hall; University Park, Pennsylvania
Dec 22, 1978*	No. 8	vs. No. 15 Illinois; Kentucky Invitational	L 61–64	6–1	Rupp Arena; Lexington, Kentucky
Dec 23, 1978*	No. 8	at No. 11 Kentucky; Kentucky Invitational	L 87–94	6–2	Rupp Arena; Lexington, Kentucky
Dec 29, 1978*	No. 19	Illinois State	W 82–72	7–2	Manley Field House (9,221); Syracuse, New York
Jan 3, 1979*		at Cornell	W 78–52	8–2	Barton Hall; Ithaca, New York
Jan 6, 1979*		Pittsburgh	W 100–74	9–2	Manley Field House; Syracuse, New York
Jan 8, 1979*		American	W 103–73	10–2	Manley Field House; Syracuse, New York
Jan 10, 1979*	No. 20	Penn State	W 85–70	11–2	Manley Field House; Syracuse, New York
Jan 13, 1979*	No. 20	at Connecticut	W 74–60	12–2	Hugh S. Greer Field House; Storrs, Connecticut
Jan 17, 1979*	No. 12	Siena	W 144–92	13–2	Manley Field House; Syracuse, New York
Jan 20, 1979*	No. 12	at Canisius	W 103–92	14–2	Buffalo Memorial Auditorium; Buffalo, New York
Jan 22, 1979*	No. 12	Rutgers	W 71–65	15–2	Manley Field House; Syracuse, New York
Jan 24, 1979*	No. 12	at No. 16 Temple	W 78–76	16–2	The Palestra; Philadelphia, Pennsylvania
Jan 27, 1979*	No. 12	Manhattan	W 113–68	17–2	Manley Field House; Syracuse, New York
Jan 29, 1979*	No. 12	West Virginia	W 90–74	18–2	Manley Field House; Syracuse, New York
Feb 7, 1979*	No. 7	vs. South Carolina	W 71–64	19–2	Madison Square Garden; New York, New York
Feb 10, 1979*	No. 7	at St. Bonaventure	W 74–69	20–2	Reilly Center; St. Bonaventure, New York
Feb 17, 1979*	No. 7	St. John's	W 79–72	21–2	Manley Field House; Syracuse, New York
Feb 21, 1979*	No. 8	Niagara	W 120–82	22–2	Manley Field House; Syracuse, New York
Feb 24, 1979*	No. 8	Colgate	W 113–62	23–2	Manley Field House; Syracuse, New York
Feb 26, 1979*	No. 8	Le Moyne	W 92–60	24–2	Onondaga County War Memorial; Syracuse, New York
ECAC South-Upstate Tournament
Mar 1, 1979*	No. 6	at St. Bonaventure; ECAC South-Upstate Tournament Semifinal	W 83–71	25–2	Rochester War Memorial; Rochester, New York
Mar 2, 1979*	No. 6	vs. No. 16 Georgetown; ECAC South-Upstate Tournament Final/Rivalry	L 58–66	25–3	Cole Fieldhouse; College Park, Maryland
NCAA Tournament
Mar 10, 1979*	(4 E) No. 8	vs. (5 E) Connecticut; First Round	W 89–81	26–3	Providence Civic Center; Providence, Rhode Island
Mar 16, 1979*	(4 E) No. 8	vs. (9 E) No. 14 Penn	L 76–84	26–4	Greensboro Coliseum; Greensboro, North Carolina
*Non-conference game. ^{#}Rankings from AP Poll. (#) Tournament seedings in parentheses. E=East.
