= 1978–79 Notre Dame Fighting Irish men's basketball team =

American college basketball season

1978–79 Notre Dame Fighting Irish men's basketball

NCAA Tournament, Elite Eight
- Conference: Independent

Ranking
- Coaches: No. 5
- AP: No. 4
- Record: 24–6
- Head coach: Digger Phelps (8th season)
- Assistant coaches: Danny Nee (3rd season); Scott Thompson (2nd season); Tom McLaughlin (1st season)
- Home arena: Joyce Center

1978–79 NCAA Division I men's basketball independents standings
	Conf.				Overall
Team	W		L	PCT	W		L	PCT
No. 8 Syracuse		–		–	26	–	4	.867
Georgetown		–		–	24	–	5	.828
No. 6 DePaul		–		–	26	–	6	.813
No. 4 Notre Dame		–		–	24	–	6	.800
VCU		–		–	20	–	5	.800
Iona		–		–	23	–	6	.793
Detroit		–		–	22	–	6	.786
Tennessee State		–		–	20	–	6	.769
Old Dominion		–		–	23	–	7	.767
No. 10 Marquette		–		–	22	–	7	.759
Wagner		–		–	21	–	7	.750
Connecticut		–		–	21	–	8	.724
UNLV		–		–	21	–	8	.724
UNC Wilmington		–		–	19	–	8	.704
Boston College		–		–	21	–	9	.700
James Madison		–		–	18	–	8	.692
Rhode Island		–		–	20	–	9	.690
George Mason		–		–	17	–	8	.680
St. Bonaventure		–		–	19	–	9	.679
Illinois State		–		–	20	–	10	.667
St. John's		–		–	21	–	11	.656
Dayton		–		–	19	–	10	.655
Boston University		–		–	17	–	9	.654
Fairfield		–		–	17	–	9	.654
Georgia Tech		–		–	17	–	9	.654
Oral Roberts		–		–	17	–	10	.630
Holy Cross		–		–	17	–	11	.607
Seton Hall		–		–	16	–	11	.593
Cleveland State		–		–	15	–	10	.600
East Tennessee State		–		–	16	–	11	.593
Maine		–		–	14	–	10	.583
UAB		–		–	15	–	11	.577
Army		–		–	14	–	11	.560
Denver		–		–	15	–	12	.556
South Carolina		–		–	15	–	12	.556
Stetson		–		–	15	–	12	.556
Siena		–		–	14	–	12	.538
St. Francis (NY)		–		–	14	–	12	.538
Navy		–		–	13	–	12	.520
Xavier		–		–	14	–	13	.519
Northeastern		–		–	13	–	13	.500
Saint Francis (PA)		–		–	13	–	13	.500
Robert Morris		–		–	13	–	14	.481
Southern Miss		–		–	13	–	14	.481
Air Force		–		–	12	–	13	.480
Long Island University		–		–	12	–	13	.480
Canisius		–		–	12	–	14	.462
Colgate		–		–	12	–	14	.462
Evansville		–		–	13	–	16	.448
East Carolina		–		–	12	–	15	.444
Loyola-Chicago		–		–	12	–	15	.444
Butler		–		–	11	–	16	.407
North Texas State		–		–	11	–	16	.407
Saint Peter's		–		–	10	–	15	.400
Campbell		–		–	10	–	16	.385
New Hampshire		–		–	10	–	16	.385
Providence		–		–	10	–	16	.385
Richmond		–		–	10	–	16	.385
Hawaii		–		–	10	–	17	.370
William & Mary		–		–	9	–	17	.346
Georgia Southern		–		–	9	–	18	.333
Fairleigh Dickinson		–		–	8	–	18	.308
Wisconsin-Milwaukee		–		–	8	–	18	.308
Vermont		–		–	8	–	18	.308
Northwestern State		–		–	7	–	19	.269
Fordham		–		–	7	–	22	.241
Catholic		–		–	6	–	20	.231
Arkansas-Little Rock		–		–	6	–	20	.231
Manhattan		–		–	6	–	20	.231
Niagara		–		–	6	–	20	.231
Portland State		–		–	6	–	21	.222
Baltimore		–		–	4	–	20	.167
Valparaiso		–		–	4	–	21	.160
Baptist		–		–	2	–	25	.074
Rankings from AP Poll

The 1978–79 Notre Dame Fighting Irish men's basketball team represented the University of Notre Dame during the 1978–79 NCAA men's basketball season. The team was led by head coach Digger Phelps and played their home games at the Joyce Center.

After reaching the school's first Final Four the previous season, Notre Dame entered the season with high expectations and a No. 3 preseason ranking (AP). One of five teams to hold the No. 1 ranking during season, the Irish earned the #1 seed in the Mideast Region of the 1979 NCAA Tournament, but were defeated by eventual the eventual NCAA champions, Michigan State, in the regional final. Notre Dame finished the season with a record of 24–6.

== Roster ==
1978–79 Notre Dame Fighting Irish men's basketball team
Players
Coaches

Pos.	#	Name	Height	Weight	Year	Previous school	Hometown
G	12	Rich Branning	6 ft 3 in (1.91 m)	160 lb (73 kg)	Jr	Marina	Huntington Beach, CA
G	24	Chris Fabian	6 ft 2 in (1.88 m)	195 lb (88 kg)	Sr	Haddonfield	Haddonfield, NJ
F/C	34	Bruce Flowers	6 ft 8 in (2.03 m)	210 lb (95 kg)	Sr	Berkley	Huntington Woods, MI
G/F	42	Bill Hanzlik	6 ft 7 in (2.01 m)	185 lb (84 kg)	Jr	Beloit	Beloit, WI
G	11	Tim Healy	6 ft 1 in (1.85 m)	170 lb (77 kg)	Jr	Cardinal Gibbons	Fort Lauderdale, FL
F	30	Tracy Jackson	6 ft 6 in (1.98 m)	210 lb (95 kg)	So	Paint Branch	Silver Spring, Maryland
C	52	Bill Laimbeer	6 ft 11 in (2.11 m)	235 lb (107 kg)	Sr	Palos Verdes; Owens CC	Palos Verdes, CA
C	55	Gilbert Salinas	6 ft 11 in (2.11 m)	215 lb (98 kg)	So		San Antonio, Texas
F	44	Kelly Tripucka	6 ft 6 in (1.98 m)	230 lb (104 kg)	So	Bloomfield	Essex Fells, New Jersey
C	32	Orlando Woolridge	6 ft 9 in (2.06 m)	215 lb (98 kg)	So	Mansfield	Mansfield, Louisiana

Head coach

- Digger Phelps

Assistant coach(es)

- Danny Nee
- Scott Thompson
- Tom McLaughlin

Legend

- (C) Team captain
- (S) Suspended
- (I) Ineligible
- (W) Walk-on
- Injured
- Current redshirt

== Schedule and results ==
Date time, TV	Rank^{#}	Opponent^{#}	Result	Record	Site city, state
Regular season
Dec 2, 1978*	No. 3	Valparaiso	W 87–57	1–0	Joyce Center (11,345); Notre Dame, Indiana
Dec 4, 1978*	No. 3	Rice	W 105–61	2–0	Joyce Center (11,345); Notre Dame, Indiana
Dec 6, 1978*	No. 3	Northwestern	W 101–57	3–0	Joyce Center (11,345); Notre Dame, Indiana
Dec 9, 1978*	No. 3	at No. 2 UCLA	W 81–78	4–0	Pauley Pavilion (12,721); Los Angeles, California
Dec 27, 1978*	No. 2	Saint Francis (PA)	W 96–43	5–0	Joyce Center (11,345); Notre Dame, Indiana
Dec 30, 1978*	No. 2	vs. No. 13 Kentucky	L 76–81	5–1	Freedom Hall (16,869); Louisville, Kentucky
Jan 6, 1979*	No. 2	at Villanova	W 75–64	6–1	The Palestra (9,208); Philadelphia, Pennsylvania
Jan 8, 1979*	No. 2	at Davidson	W 95–63	7–1	Charlotte Coliseum (6,783); Charlotte, North Carolina
Jan 13, 1979*	No. 2	at No. 13 Marquette	W 65–60	8–1	MECCA Arena (10,938); Milwaukee, Wisconsin
Jan 16, 1979*	No. 1	Lafayette	W 91–66	9–1	Joyce Center (11,345); Notre Dame, Indiana
Jan 18, 1979*	No. 1	San Francisco	W 88–69	10–1	Joyce Center (11,345); Notre Dame, Indiana
Jan 20, 1979*	No. 1	South Carolina	W 82–73	11–1	Joyce Center (11,345); Notre Dame, Indiana
Jan 24, 1979*	No. 1	Fordham	W 85–53	12–1	Joyce Center (11,345); Notre Dame, Indiana
Jan 27, 1979*	No. 1	at Maryland	L 66–67	12–2	Cole Fieldhouse (14,500); College Park, Maryland
Jan 30, 1979*	No. 1	Brown	W 80–53	13–2	Joyce Center (11,345); Notre Dame, Indiana
Feb 1, 1979*	No. 1	Xavier	W 66–57	14–2	Joyce Center (11,345); Notre Dame, Indiana
Feb 3, 1979*	No. 1	Dayton	W 86–71	15–2	Joyce Center (11,345); Notre Dame, Indiana
Feb 5, 1979*	No. 1	Loyola-Chicago	W 84–66	16–2	Joyce Center (11,345); Notre Dame, Indiana
Feb 7, 1979*	No. 1	at North Carolina State	W 53–52	17–2	Reynolds Coliseum (12,400); Raleigh, North Carolina
Feb 11, 1979*	No. 1	No. 4 UCLA	L 52–56	17–3	Joyce Center (11,345); Notre Dame, Indiana
Feb 15, 1979*	No. 3	at Manhattan	W 86–63	18–3	Draddy Gymnasium (18,106); Bronx, New York
Feb 17, 1979*	No. 3	at West Virginia	W 70–54	19–3	WVU Coliseum (15,118); Morgantown, West Virginia
Feb 21, 1979*	No. 3	Oklahoma City	W 88–60	20–3	Joyce Center (11,345); Notre Dame, Indiana
Feb 24, 1979*	No. 3	La Salle	W 93–70	21–3	Joyce Center (11,345); Notre Dame, Indiana
Feb 26, 1979*	No. 3	East Carolina	W 89–72	22–3	Joyce Center (11,345); Notre Dame, Indiana
Mar 2, 1979*	No. 2	at No. 15 DePaul	L 72–76	22–4	Alumni Hall (5,556); Chicago, Illinois
Mar 4, 1979*	No. 2	at Michigan	L 59–62	22–5	Pontiac Silverdome (37,283); Ann Arbor, Michigan
NCAA Tournament
Mar 11, 1979*	(1 ME) No. 5	vs. (8 ME) No. 20 Tennessee; Second Round	W 73–67	23–5	Murphy Center (10,982); Murfreesboro, Tennessee
Mar 16, 1979*	(1 ME) No. 5	vs. (5 ME) No. 19 Toledo; Mideast Regional semifinal – Sweet Sixteen	W 79–71	24–5	Market Square Arena (16,823); Indianapolis, Indiana
Mar 18, 1979*	(1 ME) No. 5	vs. (2 ME) No. 3 Michigan State; Mideast Regional final – Elite Eight	L 68–80	24–6	Market Square Arena (17,423); Indianapolis, Indiana
*Non-conference game. ^{#}Rankings from AP Poll. (#) Tournament seedings in parentheses. ME=Mideast.

== Rankings ==
Ranking movements Legend: ██ Increase in ranking ██ Decrease in ranking — = Not ranked
	Week																
Poll	Pre	1	2	3	4	5	6	7	8	9	10	11	12	13	14	15	Final
AP	3	3	3	2	2	2	2	2	1	1	1	1	3	3	2	5	4
Coaches	3	—	—	2	2	2	2	2	1	1	1	1	3	3	2	5	Not released

^Coaches did not release week 1 or week 2 polls.
