= 1978–79 Illinois State Redbirds men's basketball team =

American college basketball season

1978–79 Illinois State Redbirds men's basketball

Illinois State Holiday Festival champion
- Conference: Independent
- Record: 20–10
- Head coach: Bob Donewald (1st season)
- Assistant coaches: Jim Platt; Sam Skarich; Terry Smith
- Home arena: Horton Field House

1978–79 NCAA Division I men's basketball independents standings
	Conf.				Overall
Team	W		L	PCT	W		L	PCT
No. 8 Syracuse		–		–	26	–	4	.867
Georgetown		–		–	24	–	5	.828
No. 6 DePaul		–		–	26	–	6	.813
No. 4 Notre Dame		–		–	24	–	6	.800
VCU		–		–	20	–	5	.800
Iona		–		–	23	–	6	.793
Detroit		–		–	22	–	6	.786
Tennessee State		–		–	20	–	6	.769
Old Dominion		–		–	23	–	7	.767
No. 10 Marquette		–		–	22	–	7	.759
Wagner		–		–	21	–	7	.750
Connecticut		–		–	21	–	8	.724
UNLV		–		–	21	–	8	.724
UNC Wilmington		–		–	19	–	8	.704
Boston College		–		–	21	–	9	.700
James Madison		–		–	18	–	8	.692
Rhode Island		–		–	20	–	9	.690
George Mason		–		–	17	–	8	.680
St. Bonaventure		–		–	19	–	9	.679
Illinois State		–		–	20	–	10	.667
St. John's		–		–	21	–	11	.656
Dayton		–		–	19	–	10	.655
Boston University		–		–	17	–	9	.654
Fairfield		–		–	17	–	9	.654
Georgia Tech		–		–	17	–	9	.654
Oral Roberts		–		–	17	–	10	.630
Holy Cross		–		–	17	–	11	.607
Seton Hall		–		–	16	–	11	.593
Cleveland State		–		–	15	–	10	.600
East Tennessee State		–		–	16	–	11	.593
Maine		–		–	14	–	10	.583
UAB		–		–	15	–	11	.577
Army		–		–	14	–	11	.560
Denver		–		–	15	–	12	.556
South Carolina		–		–	15	–	12	.556
Stetson		–		–	15	–	12	.556
Siena		–		–	14	–	12	.538
St. Francis (NY)		–		–	14	–	12	.538
Navy		–		–	13	–	12	.520
Xavier		–		–	14	–	13	.519
Northeastern		–		–	13	–	13	.500
Saint Francis (PA)		–		–	13	–	13	.500
Robert Morris		–		–	13	–	14	.481
Southern Miss		–		–	13	–	14	.481
Air Force		–		–	12	–	13	.480
Long Island University		–		–	12	–	13	.480
Canisius		–		–	12	–	14	.462
Colgate		–		–	12	–	14	.462
Evansville		–		–	13	–	16	.448
East Carolina		–		–	12	–	15	.444
Loyola-Chicago		–		–	12	–	15	.444
Butler		–		–	11	–	16	.407
North Texas State		–		–	11	–	16	.407
Saint Peter's		–		–	10	–	15	.400
Campbell		–		–	10	–	16	.385
New Hampshire		–		–	10	–	16	.385
Providence		–		–	10	–	16	.385
Richmond		–		–	10	–	16	.385
Hawaii		–		–	10	–	17	.370
William & Mary		–		–	9	–	17	.346
Georgia Southern		–		–	9	–	18	.333
Fairleigh Dickinson		–		–	8	–	18	.308
Wisconsin-Milwaukee		–		–	8	–	18	.308
Vermont		–		–	8	–	18	.308
Northwestern State		–		–	7	–	19	.269
Fordham		–		–	7	–	22	.241
Catholic		–		–	6	–	20	.231
Arkansas-Little Rock		–		–	6	–	20	.231
Manhattan		–		–	6	–	20	.231
Niagara		–		–	6	–	20	.231
Portland State		–		–	6	–	21	.222
Baltimore		–		–	4	–	20	.167
Valparaiso		–		–	4	–	21	.160
Baptist		–		–	2	–	25	.074
Rankings from AP Poll

The 1978–79 Illinois State Redbirds men's basketball team represented Illinois State University during the 1978–79 NCAA Division I men's basketball season. The Redbirds, led by first year head coach Bob Donewald, played their home games at Horton Field House and competed as an independent (not a member of a conference). They finished the season 20–10.

== Roster ==
1978–79 Illinois State Redbirds men's basketball team
Players
Coaches

Pos.	#	Name	Height	Weight	Year	Hometown
F	31	Rick Ferina	6 ft 5 in (1.96 m)	195 lb (88 kg)	Sr	Niles, IL
G	21	Derrick Mayes	6 ft 1 in (1.85 m)	170 lb (77 kg)	Sr	Elgin, IL
C	32	Joe Galvin	7 ft 0 in (2.13 m)	218 lb (99 kg)	Jr	Bloomington, IL
G	13	Ron Jones	6 ft 5 in (1.96 m)	176 lb (80 kg)	Jr	Venice, IL
F	11	Del Yarbrough	6 ft 8 in (2.03 m)	220 lb (100 kg)	Jr	North Chicago, IL
C	35	Roy Herold	6 ft 8 in (2.03 m)	212 lb (96 kg)	So	Helsinki, Finland
F	25	Anthony Jones	6 ft 7 in (2.01 m)	190 lb (86 kg)	So	Chicago, IL
G	15	Dave Nussbaumer	6 ft 0 in (1.83 m)	175 lb (79 kg)	So	Deerfield, IL
F	24	McKay Smith	6 ft 6 in (1.98 m)	175 lb (79 kg)	So	Springfield, IL
G	42	George Carter	6 ft 3 in (1.91 m)	180 lb (82 kg)	Fr	Middletown, OH
F	33	Joe Richardson	6 ft 6 in (1.98 m)	190 lb (86 kg)	Fr	Indianapolis, IN
G	23	Dale White	6 ft 5 in (1.96 m)	190 lb (86 kg)	Fr	Covington, IN

Head coach

- Bob Donewald (Hanover)

Assistant coach(es)

- Jim Platt (Concordia–Chicago)
- Sam Skarich (Notre Dame)
- Terry Smith (Marian (IN))

Legend

- (C) Team captain
- (S) Suspended
- (I) Ineligible
- (W) Walk-on
- Injured
- Current redshirt

Roster
Last update: February 1, 2021

== Schedule ==
Date time, TV	Rank^{#}	Opponent^{#}	Result	Record	High points	High rebounds	High assists	Site (attendance) city, state
Exhibition Season
November 17, 1978*; 7:30 pm		National Team of Poland; Exhibition	W 96–69		27 – Galvin	14 – Galvin	–	Horton Field House (5,500); Normal, IL
Regular Season
December 4, 1978*; 6:30 pm		at Indiana State	L 76–78	0–1	32 – R.Jones	14 – Galvin	–	Hulman Center (10,189); Terre Haute, IN
December 6, 1978*; 7:30 pm		Southern Illinois	W 89–86	1–1	21 – Mayes	10 – Galvin, Yarbrough	–	Horton Field House (7,400); Normal, IL
December 9, 1978*; 2:00 pm		Saint Louis	W 73–63	2–1	27 – Mayes	10 – Yarbrough	–	Horton Field House (6,000); Normal, IL
December 11, 1978*; 6:30 pm		at Central Michigan	L 63–66	2–2	23 – R.Jones	7 – Yarbrough	–	Daniel P. Rose Center (3,523); Mount Pleasant, MI
December 14, 1978*; 7:30 pm		California State; Polytechnic–Pomona	W 92–64	3–2	20 – R.Jones	9 – Yarbrough	–	Horton Field House (3,000); Normal, IL
December 18, 1978*; 7:30 pm		at Western Kentucky	W 75–74 ^{OT}	4–2	25 – Mayes	13 – Galvin	–	E. A. Diddle Arena (6,200); Bowling Green, KY
December 22, 1978*		Northern Illinois; Illinois State Holiday Festival [Semifinal]	W 71–60	5–2	28 – Yarbrough	20 – Yarbrough	–	Horton Field House (3,500); Normal, IL
December 23, 1978*		Mississippi; Illinois State Holiday Festival [Final]	W 76–72	6–2	29 – R.Jones	7 – Galvin, Yarbrough	–	Horton Field House (2,800); Normal, IL
December 29, 1978*; 7:00 pm		at No. 19 Syracuse	L 72–82	6–3	24 – Galvin	4 – Mayes	–	Manley Field House (9,221); Syracuse, NY
January 3, 1979*; 7:30 pm		Bradley	W 74–61	7–3	26 – Mayes	7 – R.Jones	–	Horton Field House (5,200); Normal, IL
January 6, 1979*; 7:30 pm		at McNeese State	W 78–73 ^{OT}	8–3	27 – R.Jones	8 – Galvin, Yarbrough	–	Sudduth Coliseum (3,781); Lake Charles, LA
January 8, 1979*; 7:30 pm		North Texas State	W 98–80	9–3	23 – Mayes	14 – Yarbrough	–	Horton Field House (3,000); Normal, IL
January 10, 1979*; 7:30 pm		Nebraska–Omaha	W 74–57	10–3	21 – R.Jones	17 – Yarbrough	–	Horton Field House (2,500); Normal, IL
January 13, 1979*; 7:00 pm		at Detroit	L 81–92	10–4	33 – Galvin	10 – Yarbrough	–	Calihan Hall (4,366); Detroit, MI
January 15, 1979*; 7:30 pm		Missouri–St. Louis	W 105–60	11–4	21 – Yarbrough	7 – Yarbrough, A.Jones	–	Horton Field House (3.000); Normal, IL
January 17, 1979*; 7:00 pm		at Evansville	W 73–68	12–4	27 – R.Jones	13 – Galvin	–	Roberts Municipal Stadium (6,703); Evansville, IN
January 20, 1979*; 7:30 pm		Howard	W 88–62	13–4	22 – Galvin	11 – Galvin	–	Horton Field House (5,200); Normal, IL
January 24, 1979*; 7:30 pm		at Valparaiso	W 88–67	14–4	30 – R.Jones	13 – Galvin	–	Hilltop Gym (2,500); Valparaiso, IN
January 27, 1979*; 2:00 pm		DePaul	L 69–87	14–5	21 – R.Jones	7 – Galvin	–	Horton Field House (8,000); Normal, IL
January 31, 1979*; 7:30 pm		at Northern Illinois	L 65–76	14–6	19 – Mayes	10 – Galvin	–	Chick Evans Field House (4,850); DeKalb, IL
February 7, 1979*; 12:00 am		at Chaminade	W 82–67	15–6	27 – R.Jones	15 – Galvin	–	McCabe Gymnasium (1,100); Honolulu, HI
February 10, 1979*; 12:10 am		at Hawai'i	L 77–82	15–7	24 – Mayes	9 – Galvin	–	Neal S. Blaisdell Arena (3,104); Honolulu, HI
February 11, 1979*; 12:10 am		at Hawai'i	W 71–62	16–7	20 – Mayes, Yarbrough	12 – Yarbrough	–	Neal S. Blaisdell Arena (3,339); Honolulu, HI
February 13, 1979*; 7:30 pm		at Wisconsin–Milwaukee	W 82–65	17–7	22 – Mayes	11 – Galvin	–	Horton Field House (2,200); Normal, IL
February 15, 1979*; 7:30 pm		at South Alabama	W 77–70	18–7	20 – R.Jones	10 – Galvin	–	Jaguar Gym (3,320); Mobile, AL
February 17, 1979*; 7:30 pm		at Northeast Louisiana	L 72–80	18–8	25 – Mayes	14 – Yarbrough	–	Ewing Coliseum (7,100); Monroe, LA
February 22, 1979*; 7:30 pm		at North Texas State	L 87–90	18–9	32 – R.Jones	11 – R.Jones	–	NTSU Coliseum (1,400); Denton, TX
February 24, 1979*; 7:30 pm		at Oral Roberts	L 78–89	18–10	22 – Galvin	12 – Yarbrough	–	Mabee Center (7,568); Tulsa, OK
February 26, 1979*; 7:30 pm		Northern Michigan	W 100–83	19–10	29 – Mayes	5 – Mayes, Smith	–	Horton Field House (1,800); Normal, IL
March 2, 1979*; 7:30 pm		Southern Illinois–Edwardsville	W 94–65	20–10	25 – Mayes, Yarbrough	14 – Galvin	–	Horton Field House (3,300); Normal, IL
*Non-conference game. ^{#}Rankings from AP Poll. (#) Tournament seedings in parentheses. All times are in Central Standard Time.
