= 1978–79 Iona Gaels men's basketball team =

American college basketball season

1978–79 Iona Gaels men's basketball

NCAA tournament, First Round
- Conference: Independent
- Record: 23–6
- Head coach: Jim Valvano (4th season)
- Home arena: Hynes Athletic Center

1978–79 NCAA Division I men's basketball independents standings
	Conf.				Overall
Team	W		L	PCT	W		L	PCT
No. 8 Syracuse		–		–	26	–	4	.867
Georgetown		–		–	24	–	5	.828
No. 6 DePaul		–		–	26	–	6	.813
No. 4 Notre Dame		–		–	24	–	6	.800
VCU		–		–	20	–	5	.800
Iona		–		–	23	–	6	.793
Detroit		–		–	22	–	6	.786
Tennessee State		–		–	20	–	6	.769
Old Dominion		–		–	23	–	7	.767
No. 10 Marquette		–		–	22	–	7	.759
Wagner		–		–	21	–	7	.750
Connecticut		–		–	21	–	8	.724
UNLV		–		–	21	–	8	.724
UNC Wilmington		–		–	19	–	8	.704
Boston College		–		–	21	–	9	.700
James Madison		–		–	18	–	8	.692
Rhode Island		–		–	20	–	9	.690
George Mason		–		–	17	–	8	.680
St. Bonaventure		–		–	19	–	9	.679
Illinois State		–		–	20	–	10	.667
St. John's		–		–	21	–	11	.656
Dayton		–		–	19	–	10	.655
Boston University		–		–	17	–	9	.654
Fairfield		–		–	17	–	9	.654
Georgia Tech		–		–	17	–	9	.654
Oral Roberts		–		–	17	–	10	.630
Holy Cross		–		–	17	–	11	.607
Seton Hall		–		–	16	–	11	.593
Cleveland State		–		–	15	–	10	.600
East Tennessee State		–		–	16	–	11	.593
Maine		–		–	14	–	10	.583
UAB		–		–	15	–	11	.577
Army		–		–	14	–	11	.560
Denver		–		–	15	–	12	.556
South Carolina		–		–	15	–	12	.556
Stetson		–		–	15	–	12	.556
Siena		–		–	14	–	12	.538
St. Francis (NY)		–		–	14	–	12	.538
Navy		–		–	13	–	12	.520
Xavier		–		–	14	–	13	.519
Northeastern		–		–	13	–	13	.500
Saint Francis (PA)		–		–	13	–	13	.500
Robert Morris		–		–	13	–	14	.481
Southern Miss		–		–	13	–	14	.481
Air Force		–		–	12	–	13	.480
Long Island University		–		–	12	–	13	.480
Canisius		–		–	12	–	14	.462
Colgate		–		–	12	–	14	.462
Evansville		–		–	13	–	16	.448
East Carolina		–		–	12	–	15	.444
Loyola-Chicago		–		–	12	–	15	.444
Butler		–		–	11	–	16	.407
North Texas State		–		–	11	–	16	.407
Saint Peter's		–		–	10	–	15	.400
Campbell		–		–	10	–	16	.385
New Hampshire		–		–	10	–	16	.385
Providence		–		–	10	–	16	.385
Richmond		–		–	10	–	16	.385
Hawaii		–		–	10	–	17	.370
William & Mary		–		–	9	–	17	.346
Georgia Southern		–		–	9	–	18	.333
Fairleigh Dickinson		–		–	8	–	18	.308
Wisconsin-Milwaukee		–		–	8	–	18	.308
Vermont		–		–	8	–	18	.308
Northwestern State		–		–	7	–	19	.269
Fordham		–		–	7	–	22	.241
Catholic		–		–	6	–	20	.231
Arkansas-Little Rock		–		–	6	–	20	.231
Manhattan		–		–	6	–	20	.231
Niagara		–		–	6	–	20	.231
Portland State		–		–	6	–	21	.222
Baltimore		–		–	4	–	20	.167
Valparaiso		–		–	4	–	21	.160
Baptist		–		–	2	–	25	.074
Rankings from AP Poll

The 1978–79 Iona Gaels men's basketball team represented Iona College during the 1978–79 NCAA Division I men's basketball season. The Gaels, led fourth-year by head coach Jim Valvano, played their home games at the Hynes Athletic Center. The Gaels received a bid to the 1979 NCAA tournament. Competing as the No. 8 seed in the East region, the Gaels were defeated by No. 9 seed and eventual Final Four participant Penn in the opening round.

== Roster ==
1978–79 Iona Gaels men's basketball team
Players
Coaches

Pos.	#	Name	Height	Weight	Year	Hometown
G	14	Kevin Hamilton	6 ft 3 in (1.91 m)	—	Jr
G		Glenn Vickers	6 ft 1 in (1.85 m)	—	Jr
C	43	Jeff Ruland	6 ft 10 in (2.08 m)	230 lb (104 kg)	So	Sachem HS	Lake Ronkonkoma, New York

Head coach

- Jim Valvano

Assistant coach(es)

Legend

- (C) Team captain
- (S) Suspended
- (I) Ineligible
- (W) Walk-on
- Injured
- Current redshirt

Roster

== Schedule and results ==
Date time, TV	Rank^{#}	Opponent^{#}	Result	Record	Site (attendance) city, state
Regular season
Nov 25, 1978*		St. Lawrence	W 107–77	1–0	Hynes Athletic Center; New Rochelle, New York
Nov 28, 1978*		Pace	W 113–64	2–0	Hynes Athletic Center; New Rochelle, New York
Dec 1, 1978*		vs. Utah State; Carrier Classic	W 73–61	3–0	Manley Field House; Syracuse, New York
Dec 2, 1978*		at No. 9 Syracuse; Carrier Classic	L 76–89	3–1	Manley Field House; Syracuse, New York
Dec 6, 1978*		at Fairleigh Dickinson	W 81–63	4–1	
Dec 9, 1978*		at Auburn	L 66–74	4–2	Memorial Coliseum; Auburn, Alabama
Dec 21, 1978*		Detroit	L 72–76	4–3	Hynes Athletic Center; New Rochelle, New York
Dec 23, 1978*		New Orleans	W 75–72	5–3	Hynes Athletic Center; New Rochelle, New York
Dec 29, 1978*		Northeastern; Iona Classic	W 103–88	6–3	Hynes Athletic Center; New Rochelle, New York
Dec 30, 1978*		Saint Mary's; Iona Classic	W 84–74	7–3	Hynes Athletic Center; New Rochelle, New York
Jan 2, 1979*		East Carolina	L 75–76	7–4	Hynes Athletic Center; New Rochelle, New York
Jan 6, 1979*		Wagner	W 82–78	8–4	Hynes Athletic Center; New Rochelle, New York
Jan 10, 1979*		Niagara	W 78–66	9–4	Hynes Athletic Center; New Rochelle, New York
Jan 13, 1979*		at Milwaukee	W 88–75	10–4	
Jan 17, 1979*		at Saint Peter's	W 70–68	11–4	
Jan 20, 1979*		UAB	W 61–59	12–4	Hynes Athletic Center (2,020); New Rochelle, New York
Jan 22, 1979*		vs. Pittsburgh	W 84–79	13–4	
Jan 24, 1979*		Fairfield	W 97–89	14–4	Hynes Athletic Center; New Rochelle, New York
Jan 30, 1979*		at UNLV	L 79–86	14–5	
Feb 3, 1979*		St. Francis (NY)	W 97–89	14–5	Hynes Athletic Center; New Rochelle, New York
Feb 7, 1979*		vs. Holy Cross	W 64–62	15–5	
Feb 10, 1979*		at Saint Francis (PA)	W 65–63	16–5	
Feb 14, 1979*		at Army	W 55–53	17–5	
Feb 17, 1979*		Long Beach State	W 81–63	18–5	Hynes Athletic Center; New Rochelle, New York
Feb 19, 1979*		at Siena	W 70–68	19–5	
Feb 24, 1979*		Fordham	W 79–70	20–5	Hynes Athletic Center; New Rochelle, New York
ECAC Metro tournament
Mar 1, 1979*		vs. Seton Hall; Semifinals	W 80–73	21–5	Nassau Coliseum; Uniondale, New York
Mar 3, 1979*		vs. St. John's; Final	W 63–57	22–5	Nassau Coliseum; Uniondale, New York
NCAA tournament
Mar 9, 1979*	(8 E)	vs. (9 E) Pennsylvania; First round	L 69–73	22–6	Reynolds Coliseum; Raleigh, North Carolina
*Non-conference game. ^{#}Rankings from AP poll. (#) Tournament seedings in parentheses. E=East. All times are in Eastern Time.
