= 1978–79 Connecticut Huskies men's basketball team =

American college basketball season

1978–79 Connecticut Huskies men's basketball

ECAC Tournament champions

NCAA tournament, Second Round
- Conference: Independent
- Record: 21–8
- Head coach: Dom Perno (2nd season)
- Assistant coaches: Greg Ashford; Jim O’Brien
- Home arena: Hugh S. Greer Field House; New Haven Coliseum

1978–79 NCAA Division I men's basketball independents standings
	Conf.				Overall
Team	W		L	PCT	W		L	PCT
No. 8 Syracuse		–		–	26	–	4	.867
Georgetown		–		–	24	–	5	.828
No. 6 DePaul		–		–	26	–	6	.813
No. 4 Notre Dame		–		–	24	–	6	.800
VCU		–		–	20	–	5	.800
Iona		–		–	23	–	6	.793
Detroit		–		–	22	–	6	.786
Tennessee State		–		–	20	–	6	.769
Old Dominion		–		–	23	–	7	.767
No. 10 Marquette		–		–	22	–	7	.759
Wagner		–		–	21	–	7	.750
Connecticut		–		–	21	–	8	.724
UNLV		–		–	21	–	8	.724
UNC Wilmington		–		–	19	–	8	.704
Boston College		–		–	21	–	9	.700
James Madison		–		–	18	–	8	.692
Rhode Island		–		–	20	–	9	.690
George Mason		–		–	17	–	8	.680
St. Bonaventure		–		–	19	–	9	.679
Illinois State		–		–	20	–	10	.667
St. John's		–		–	21	–	11	.656
Dayton		–		–	19	–	10	.655
Boston University		–		–	17	–	9	.654
Fairfield		–		–	17	–	9	.654
Georgia Tech		–		–	17	–	9	.654
Oral Roberts		–		–	17	–	10	.630
Holy Cross		–		–	17	–	11	.607
Seton Hall		–		–	16	–	11	.593
Cleveland State		–		–	15	–	10	.600
East Tennessee State		–		–	16	–	11	.593
Maine		–		–	14	–	10	.583
UAB		–		–	15	–	11	.577
Army		–		–	14	–	11	.560
Denver		–		–	15	–	12	.556
South Carolina		–		–	15	–	12	.556
Stetson		–		–	15	–	12	.556
Siena		–		–	14	–	12	.538
St. Francis (NY)		–		–	14	–	12	.538
Navy		–		–	13	–	12	.520
Xavier		–		–	14	–	13	.519
Northeastern		–		–	13	–	13	.500
Saint Francis (PA)		–		–	13	–	13	.500
Robert Morris		–		–	13	–	14	.481
Southern Miss		–		–	13	–	14	.481
Air Force		–		–	12	–	13	.480
Long Island University		–		–	12	–	13	.480
Canisius		–		–	12	–	14	.462
Colgate		–		–	12	–	14	.462
Evansville		–		–	13	–	16	.448
East Carolina		–		–	12	–	15	.444
Loyola-Chicago		–		–	12	–	15	.444
Butler		–		–	11	–	16	.407
North Texas State		–		–	11	–	16	.407
Saint Peter's		–		–	10	–	15	.400
Campbell		–		–	10	–	16	.385
New Hampshire		–		–	10	–	16	.385
Providence		–		–	10	–	16	.385
Richmond		–		–	10	–	16	.385
Hawaii		–		–	10	–	17	.370
William & Mary		–		–	9	–	17	.346
Georgia Southern		–		–	9	–	18	.333
Fairleigh Dickinson		–		–	8	–	18	.308
Wisconsin-Milwaukee		–		–	8	–	18	.308
Vermont		–		–	8	–	18	.308
Northwestern State		–		–	7	–	19	.269
Fordham		–		–	7	–	22	.241
Catholic		–		–	6	–	20	.231
Arkansas-Little Rock		–		–	6	–	20	.231
Manhattan		–		–	6	–	20	.231
Niagara		–		–	6	–	20	.231
Portland State		–		–	6	–	21	.222
Baltimore		–		–	4	–	20	.167
Valparaiso		–		–	4	–	21	.160
Baptist		–		–	2	–	25	.074
Rankings from AP Poll

The 1978–79 Connecticut Huskies men's basketball team represented the University of Connecticut in the 1978–79 collegiate men's basketball season. The Huskies completed the season with a 21–8 overall record. The Huskies were an NCAA Division I Independent school for men's basketball this year. They were the ECAC Tournament champions and made it to the second round of the 1979 NCAA Men's Division I Basketball Tournament. The Huskies played their home games at Hugh S. Greer Field House in Storrs, Connecticut and the New Haven Coliseum in New Haven, Connecticut, and were led by second-year head coach Dom Perno.

== Schedule ==
Date time, TV	Rank^{#}	Opponent^{#}	Result	Record	Site (attendance) city, state
Regular season
11/24/1978*		vs. Long Island; Charlotte Invitational Tournament	W 84–69	1–0	Charlotte, NC
11/25/1978*		vs. Davidson; Charlotte Invitational Tournament	L 81–84	1–1	Charlotte, NC
12/2/1978*		at Yale	L 78–94	1–2	Payne Whitney Gymnasium; New Haven, CT
12/6/1978*		Fairfield	W 68–67	2–2	Hugh S. Greer Field House; Storrs, CT
12/9/1978*		Boston University	W 92–84	3–2	Hugh S. Greer Field House; Storrs, CT
12/13/1978*		at Massachusetts	W 65–62	4–2	Curry Hicks Cage; Amherst, MA
12/23/1978*		Maine	W 97–79	5–2	Hugh S. Greer Field House; Storrs, CT
12/29/1978*		Tulsa; Connecticut Mutual Classic	W 89–68	6–2	New Haven Coliseum; New Haven, CT
12/30/1978*		East Carolina; Connecticut Mutual Classic	W 80–68	7–2	New Haven Coliseum; New Haven, CT
1/3/1979*		at New Hampshire	W 72–66	8–2	Lundholm Gym; Durham, NH
1/9/1979*		Rutgers	W 69–67 ^{OT}	9–2	Hugh S. Greer Field House; Storrs, CT
1/11/1979*		at Boston University	W 63–62 ^{OT}	10–2	Case Gym; Boston, MA
1/13/1979*		Syracuse; Rivalry	L 60–74	10–3	New Haven Coliseum; New Haven, CT
1/17/1979*		at Boston College	L 80–90	10–4	Roberts Center; Boston, MA
1/20/1979*		at Providence	L 63–64	10–5	Providence Civic Center; Providence, RI
1/26/1979*		vs. Holy Cross; Colonial Classic	W 109–102 ^{OT}	11–5	Boston Garden; Boston, MA
1/28/1979*		vs. Boston College; Colonial Classic	L 77–78	11–6	Boston Garden; Boston, MA
1/31/1979*		Manhattan	W 77–64	12–6	New Haven Coliseum; New Haven, CT
2/3/1979*		New Hampshire	W 81–64	13–6	Hugh S. Greer Field House; Storrs, CT
2/6/1979*		Harvard	W 84–70	14–6	Hugh S. Greer Field House; Storrs, CT
2/8/1979*		at Fordham	W 93–80	15–6	Rose Hill Gymnasium; New York, NY
2/10/1979*		Massachusetts	W 79–59	16–6	Hugh S. Greer Field House; Storrs, CT
2/13/1979*		at Rhode Island	L 71–84	16–7	Keaney Gymnasium; Kingston, RI
2/17/1979*		at Vermont	W 79–62	17–7	Patrick Gym; Burlington, VT
2/21/1979*		St. Peter's	W 80–70	18–7	Hugh S. Greer Field House; Storrs, CT
2/24/1979*		Rhode Island	W 80–75 ^{OT}	19–7	New Haven Coliseum; New Haven, CT
ECAC tournament
3/1/1979*		vs. Boston College; Semifinals	W 91–74	20–7	Providence Civic Center; Providence, RI
3/3/1979*		vs. Rhode Island; Finals	W 58–50	21–7	Providence Civic Center; Providence, RI
NCAA tournament
3/10/1979*	No. (5)	vs. No. (4) Syracuse; Second Round/Rivalry	L 81–89	21–8	Providence Civic Center; Providence, RI
*Non-conference game. ^{#}Rankings from AP Poll. (#) Tournament seedings in parentheses. All times are in Eastern Time.

Schedule Source:
