= 1978–79 Marquette Warriors men's basketball team =

American college basketball season

1978–79 Marquette Warriors men's basketball

NCAA Tournament, Sweet Sixteen
- Conference: Independent

Ranking
- Coaches: No. 13
- AP: No. 10
- Record: 22–7
- Head coach: Hank Raymonds (2nd season)
- Home arena: MECCA Arena

1978–79 NCAA Division I men's basketball independents standings
	Conf.				Overall
Team	W		L	PCT	W		L	PCT
No. 8 Syracuse		–		–	26	–	4	.867
Georgetown		–		–	24	–	5	.828
No. 6 DePaul		–		–	26	–	6	.813
No. 4 Notre Dame		–		–	24	–	6	.800
VCU		–		–	20	–	5	.800
Iona		–		–	23	–	6	.793
Detroit		–		–	22	–	6	.786
Tennessee State		–		–	20	–	6	.769
Old Dominion		–		–	23	–	7	.767
No. 10 Marquette		–		–	22	–	7	.759
Wagner		–		–	21	–	7	.750
Connecticut		–		–	21	–	8	.724
UNLV		–		–	21	–	8	.724
UNC Wilmington		–		–	19	–	8	.704
Boston College		–		–	21	–	9	.700
James Madison		–		–	18	–	8	.692
Rhode Island		–		–	20	–	9	.690
George Mason		–		–	17	–	8	.680
St. Bonaventure		–		–	19	–	9	.679
Illinois State		–		–	20	–	10	.667
St. John's		–		–	21	–	11	.656
Dayton		–		–	19	–	10	.655
Boston University		–		–	17	–	9	.654
Fairfield		–		–	17	–	9	.654
Georgia Tech		–		–	17	–	9	.654
Oral Roberts		–		–	17	–	10	.630
Holy Cross		–		–	17	–	11	.607
Seton Hall		–		–	16	–	11	.593
Cleveland State		–		–	15	–	10	.600
East Tennessee State		–		–	16	–	11	.593
Maine		–		–	14	–	10	.583
UAB		–		–	15	–	11	.577
Army		–		–	14	–	11	.560
Denver		–		–	15	–	12	.556
South Carolina		–		–	15	–	12	.556
Stetson		–		–	15	–	12	.556
Siena		–		–	14	–	12	.538
St. Francis (NY)		–		–	14	–	12	.538
Navy		–		–	13	–	12	.520
Xavier		–		–	14	–	13	.519
Northeastern		–		–	13	–	13	.500
Saint Francis (PA)		–		–	13	–	13	.500
Robert Morris		–		–	13	–	14	.481
Southern Miss		–		–	13	–	14	.481
Air Force		–		–	12	–	13	.480
Long Island University		–		–	12	–	13	.480
Canisius		–		–	12	–	14	.462
Colgate		–		–	12	–	14	.462
Evansville		–		–	13	–	16	.448
East Carolina		–		–	12	–	15	.444
Loyola-Chicago		–		–	12	–	15	.444
Butler		–		–	11	–	16	.407
North Texas State		–		–	11	–	16	.407
Saint Peter's		–		–	10	–	15	.400
Campbell		–		–	10	–	16	.385
New Hampshire		–		–	10	–	16	.385
Providence		–		–	10	–	16	.385
Richmond		–		–	10	–	16	.385
Hawaii		–		–	10	–	17	.370
William & Mary		–		–	9	–	17	.346
Georgia Southern		–		–	9	–	18	.333
Fairleigh Dickinson		–		–	8	–	18	.308
Wisconsin-Milwaukee		–		–	8	–	18	.308
Vermont		–		–	8	–	18	.308
Northwestern State		–		–	7	–	19	.269
Fordham		–		–	7	–	22	.241
Catholic		–		–	6	–	20	.231
Arkansas-Little Rock		–		–	6	–	20	.231
Manhattan		–		–	6	–	20	.231
Niagara		–		–	6	–	20	.231
Portland State		–		–	6	–	21	.222
Baltimore		–		–	4	–	20	.167
Valparaiso		–		–	4	–	21	.160
Baptist		–		–	2	–	25	.074
Rankings from AP Poll

The 1978–79 Marquette Warriors men's basketball team represented the Marquette University during the 1978–79 season. The Warriors were led by head coach Hank Raymonds and played their home games in MECCA Arena in Milwaukee, Wisconsin. The Warriors received an at-large bid to the NCAA Tournament where they reached the Sweet Sixteen. Marquette finished the season with a 22–7 record.

== Roster ==
1978–79 Marquette Warriors men's basketball team
Players
Coaches

Pos.	#	Name	Height	Weight	Year	Hometown
G	23	Mike Wilson	6 ft 4 in (1.93 m)	165 lb (75 kg)	Fr	Memphis, Tennessee
G	31	Sam Worthen	6 ft 5 in (1.96 m)	190 lb (86 kg)	Jr	Brooklyn, New York
F	33	Bernard Toone	6 ft 9 in (2.06 m)	205 lb (93 kg)	Sr	Yonkers, New York
F	40	Jim Dudley	6 ft 6 in (1.98 m)	190 lb (86 kg)	Sr	South Milwaukee, Wisconsin

Head coach

- Hank Raymonds

Assistant coach(es)

Legend

- (C) Team captain
- (S) Suspended
- (I) Ineligible
- (W) Walk-on
- Injured
- Current redshirt

== Schedule and results ==
Date time, TV	Rank^{#}	Opponent^{#}	Result	Record	Site city, state
Regular season
Nov 29, 1978*	No. 17	Belmont Abbey	W 70–56	1–0	MECCA Arena (10,938); Milwaukee, Wisconsin
Dec 2, 1978*	No. 17	Northern Michigan	W 80–50	2–0	MECCA Arena (10,938); Milwaukee, Wisconsin
Dec 6, 1978*	No. 16	at Bowling Green State	W 72–57	3–0	Anderson Arena (5,179); Bowling Green, Ohio
Dec 9, 1978*	No. 16	Missouri	W 74–57	4–0	MECCA Arena (10,938); Milwaukee, Wisconsin
Dec 16, 1978*	No. 14	Minnesota	W 72–55	5–0	MECCA Arena (10,938); Milwaukee, Wisconsin
Dec 20, 1978*	No. 13	at Western Michigan	W 76–60	6–0	University Arena (3,510); Kalamazoo, Michigan
Dec 23, 1978*	No. 13	at Wisconsin	L 52–65	6–1	Wisconsin Field House (12,204); Madison, Wisconsin
Dec 29, 1978*	No. 16	North Texas	W 84–69	7–1	MECCA Arena (10,938); Milwaukee, Wisconsin
Dec 30, 1978*	No. 16	Charlotte	W 61–57	8–1	MECCA Arena (10,938); Milwaukee, Wisconsin
Jan 3, 1979*	No. 17	at Brown	W 57–49	9–1	Marvel Gymnasium (3,200); Providence, Rhode Island
Jan 5, 1979*	No. 17	at Maine	W 57–46	10–1	Bangor Auditorium (7,750); Orono, Maine
Jan 9, 1979*	No. 13	Southwestern Louisiana	W 84–78	11–1	MECCA Arena (10,938); Milwaukee, Wisconsin
Jan 13, 1979*	No. 13	No. 2 Notre Dame	L 60–65	11–2	MECCA Arena (10,938); Milwaukee, Wisconsin
Jan 16, 1979*	No. 13	Long Beach State	W 99–80	12–2	MECCA Arena (10,938); Milwaukee, Wisconsin
Jan 20, 1979*	No. 13	Xavier	W 67–50	13–2	MECCA Arena (10,938); Milwaukee, Wisconsin
Jan 23, 1979*	No. 13	Oral Roberts	W 75–60	14–2	MECCA Arena (10,938); Milwaukee, Wisconsin
Jan 28, 1979*	No. 13	at No. 7 Duke	L 64–69	14–3	Greensboro Coliseum (8,564); Durham, North Carolina
Jan 30, 1979*	No. 12	at Creighton	W 79–77	15–3	Omaha Civic Auditorium (8,031); Omaha, Nebraska
Feb 2, 1979*	No. 12	at Saint Louis	W 71–51	16–3	St. Louis Arena (10,311); St. Louis, Missouri
Feb 6, 1979*	No. 9	Detroit	L 63–64	16–4	MECCA Arena (10,938); Milwaukee, Wisconsin
Feb 10, 1979*	No. 9	No. 5 Louisville	W 71–55	17–4	MECCA Arena (10,938); Milwaukee, Wisconsin
Feb 13, 1979*	No. 10	Stetson	W 86–78	18–4	MECCA Arena (10,938); Milwaukee, Wisconsin
Feb 17, 1979*	No. 10	Loyola–Chicago	W 75–63	19–4	MECCA Arena (10,938); Milwaukee, Wisconsin
Feb 24, 1979*	No. 9	at No. 20 DePaul	L 60–61	19–5	Alumni Hall (5,555); Chicago, Illinois
Feb 27, 1979*	No. 9	South Carolina	W 83–64	20–5	MECCA Arena (10,938); Milwaukee, Wisconsin
Mar 1, 1979*	No. 10	at Air Force	W 61–43	21–5	Clune Arena (5,100); Colorado Springs, Colorado
Mar 4, 1979*	No. 10	at Nevada-Las Vegas	L 83–86	21–6	Las Vegas Convention Center (6,376); Las Vegas, Nevada
NCAA Tournament
Mar 10, 1979*	(3 W) No. 10	vs. (6 W) Pacific; Second round	W 73–48	22–6	McKale Center (6,207); Tucson, Arizona
Mar 15, 1979*	(3 W) No. 10	vs. (2 W) No. 6 DePaul; West Regional semifinal – Sweet Sixteen	L 56–62	22–7	Marriott Center (14,988); Provo, Utah
*Non-conference game. ^{#}Rankings from AP Poll. (#) Tournament seedings in parentheses. W=West.

== Awards and honors ==
- Bernard Toole – All-American
