= 1978–79 DePaul Blue Demons men's basketball team =

American college basketball season

1978–79 DePaul Blue Demons men's basketball
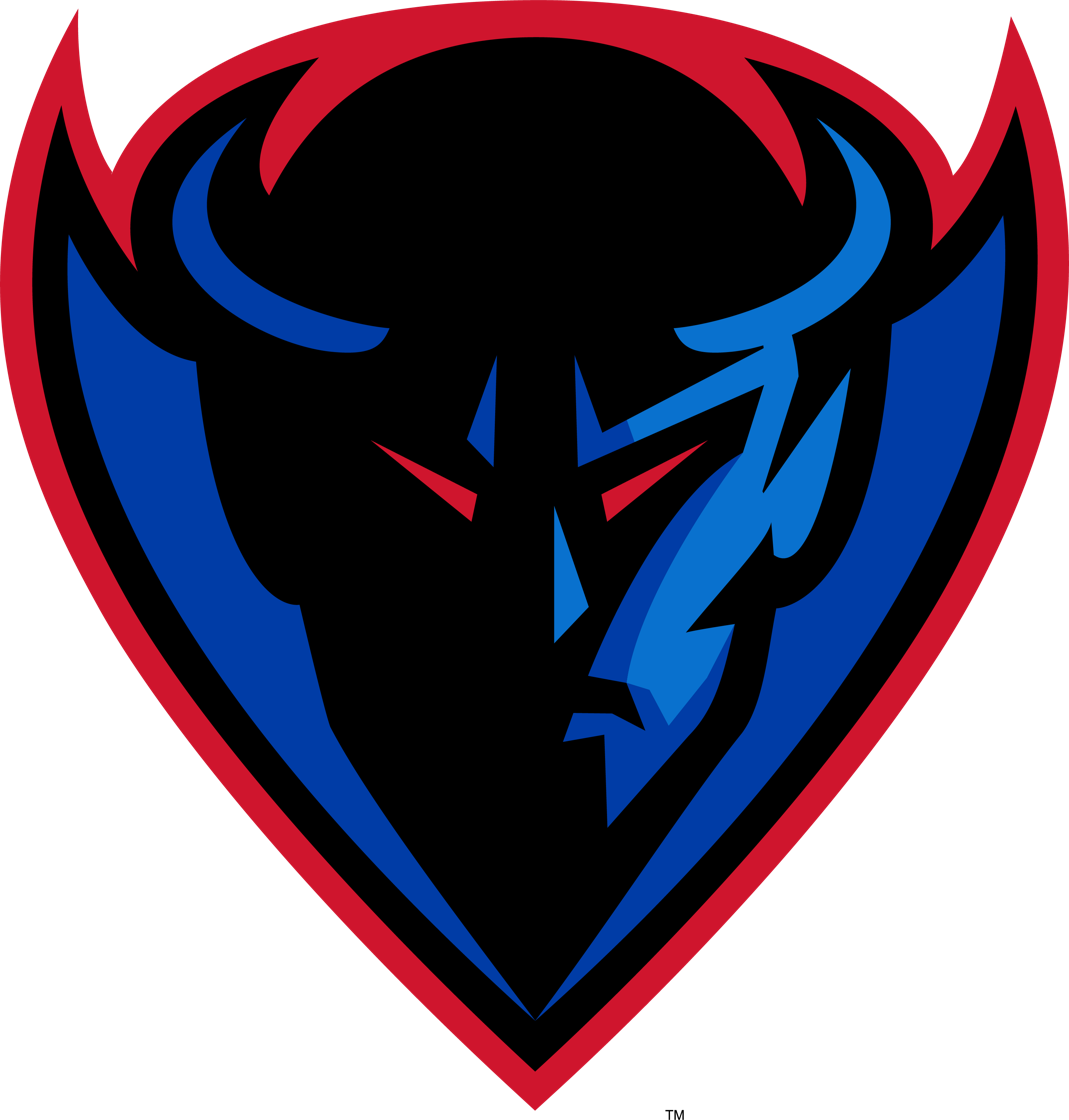

NCAA tournament, Final Four
- Conference: Independent

Ranking
- Coaches: No. 8
- AP: No. 6
- Record: 26–6
- Head coach: Ray Meyer (37th season)
- Assistant coach: Joey Meyer (5th season)
- Home arena: Alumni Hall

1978–79 NCAA Division I men's basketball independents standings
	Conf.				Overall
Team	W		L	PCT	W		L	PCT
No. 8 Syracuse		–		–	26	–	4	.867
Georgetown		–		–	24	–	5	.828
No. 6 DePaul		–		–	26	–	6	.813
No. 4 Notre Dame		–		–	24	–	6	.800
VCU		–		–	20	–	5	.800
Iona		–		–	23	–	6	.793
Detroit		–		–	22	–	6	.786
Tennessee State		–		–	20	–	6	.769
Old Dominion		–		–	23	–	7	.767
No. 10 Marquette		–		–	22	–	7	.759
Wagner		–		–	21	–	7	.750
Connecticut		–		–	21	–	8	.724
UNLV		–		–	21	–	8	.724
UNC Wilmington		–		–	19	–	8	.704
Boston College		–		–	21	–	9	.700
James Madison		–		–	18	–	8	.692
Rhode Island		–		–	20	–	9	.690
George Mason		–		–	17	–	8	.680
St. Bonaventure		–		–	19	–	9	.679
Illinois State		–		–	20	–	10	.667
St. John's		–		–	21	–	11	.656
Dayton		–		–	19	–	10	.655
Boston University		–		–	17	–	9	.654
Fairfield		–		–	17	–	9	.654
Georgia Tech		–		–	17	–	9	.654
Oral Roberts		–		–	17	–	10	.630
Holy Cross		–		–	17	–	11	.607
Seton Hall		–		–	16	–	11	.593
Cleveland State		–		–	15	–	10	.600
East Tennessee State		–		–	16	–	11	.593
Maine		–		–	14	–	10	.583
UAB		–		–	15	–	11	.577
Army		–		–	14	–	11	.560
Denver		–		–	15	–	12	.556
South Carolina		–		–	15	–	12	.556
Stetson		–		–	15	–	12	.556
Siena		–		–	14	–	12	.538
St. Francis (NY)		–		–	14	–	12	.538
Navy		–		–	13	–	12	.520
Xavier		–		–	14	–	13	.519
Northeastern		–		–	13	–	13	.500
Saint Francis (PA)		–		–	13	–	13	.500
Robert Morris		–		–	13	–	14	.481
Southern Miss		–		–	13	–	14	.481
Air Force		–		–	12	–	13	.480
Long Island University		–		–	12	–	13	.480
Canisius		–		–	12	–	14	.462
Colgate		–		–	12	–	14	.462
Evansville		–		–	13	–	16	.448
East Carolina		–		–	12	–	15	.444
Loyola-Chicago		–		–	12	–	15	.444
Butler		–		–	11	–	16	.407
North Texas State		–		–	11	–	16	.407
Saint Peter's		–		–	10	–	15	.400
Campbell		–		–	10	–	16	.385
New Hampshire		–		–	10	–	16	.385
Providence		–		–	10	–	16	.385
Richmond		–		–	10	–	16	.385
Hawaii		–		–	10	–	17	.370
William & Mary		–		–	9	–	17	.346
Georgia Southern		–		–	9	–	18	.333
Fairleigh Dickinson		–		–	8	–	18	.308
Wisconsin-Milwaukee		–		–	8	–	18	.308
Vermont		–		–	8	–	18	.308
Northwestern State		–		–	7	–	19	.269
Fordham		–		–	7	–	22	.241
Catholic		–		–	6	–	20	.231
Arkansas-Little Rock		–		–	6	–	20	.231
Manhattan		–		–	6	–	20	.231
Niagara		–		–	6	–	20	.231
Portland State		–		–	6	–	21	.222
Baltimore		–		–	4	–	20	.167
Valparaiso		–		–	4	–	21	.160
Baptist		–		–	2	–	25	.074
Rankings from AP Poll

The 1978–79 DePaul Blue Demons men's basketball team represented DePaul University during the 1978–79 NCAA Division I men's basketball season. They were led by head coach Ray Meyer, in his 37th season, and played their home games at the Alumni Hall in Chicago. After starting the regular season unranked, the Blue Demons won 22 of 27 games to earn a top ten ranking and the #2 seed in the West region of the NCAA tournament. DePaul began tournament play by defeating USC and Marquette, then knocked off #1 seed UCLA, avenging a season-opening loss, to earn the program's second trip to the Final Four. Though the team fell to the #1 ranked and unbeaten Indiana State – led by NCAA Player of the Year Larry Bird – in the National semifinals, they bounced back to defeat Penn to claim third place. They finished the season with an overall record of 26–6.

As of 2025, this is the latest Final Four to include DePaul, as well as the last time the program has made the Elite Eight. The program would make three Sweet Sixteens in the 1980s, and has not ventured past the first weekend since then.

== Roster ==
1978–79 DePaul Blue Demons men's basketball team
Players
Coaches

Pos.	#	Name	Height	Weight	Year	Previous school	Hometown
F/C	11	James Mitchem	6 ft 9 in (2.06 m)	215 lb (98 kg)	Jr	St. Pius X	Albuquerque, NM
G	15	Clyde Bradshaw	6 ft 0 in (1.83 m)	170 lb (77 kg)	So	East Orange	East Orange, NJ
F	21	Dennis McGuire	6 ft 8 in (2.03 m)	195 lb (88 kg)	So	Holy Cross	River Grove, Illinois
G	24	Gary Garland	6 ft 4 in (1.93 m)	—	Sr	Clifford J. Scott	East Orange, NJ
F	30	Curtis Watkins	6 ft 6 in (1.98 m)	190 lb (86 kg)	Sr	Thornton	Harvey, IL
F	32	Mark Aguirre	6 ft 7 in (2.01 m)	225 lb (102 kg)	Fr	Westinghouse	Chicago, IL
F/C	54	William Madey	6 ft 8 in (2.03 m)	220 lb (100 kg)	Jr	Gordon Tech	Chicago, IL

Head coach

- Ray Meyer (Notre Dame)

Assistant coach(es)

- Joey Meyer
- Jim Molinari
- Ken Sarubbi

Legend

- (C) Team captain
- (S) Suspended
- (I) Ineligible
- (W) Walk-on
- Injured
- Current redshirt

Roster

== Schedule and results ==
Date time, TV	Rank^{#}	Opponent^{#}	Result	Record	Site city, state
Regular season
Nov 25, 1978*		at No. 2 UCLA	L 85–108	0–1	Pauley Pavilion (12,178); Los Angeles, CA
Nov 29, 1978*		at Evansville	W 74–55	1–1	Roberts Stadium; Evansville, IN
Dec 2, 1978*		Northern Illinois	W 108–86	2–1	Alumni Hall; Chicago, IL
Dec 4, 1978*		Eastern Michigan	W 96–68	3–1	Alumni Hall; Chicago, IL
Dec 9, 1978*		at Wichita State	L 92–95	3–2	Levitt Arena; Wichita, KS
Dec 13, 1978*		at Butler	W 81–62	4–2	Hinkle Fieldhouse; Indianapolis, IN
Dec 16, 1978*		Wisconsin	W 84–78	5–2	Alumni Hall; Chicago, IL
Dec 19, 1978*		Northwestern	W 90–83 ^{OT}	6–2	Alumni Hall; Chicago, IL
Dec 23, 1978*		at Bradley	W 51–50	7–2	Robertson Memorial Field House; Peoria, IL
Dec 30, 1978*		Creighton	W 88–70	8–2	Alumni Hall; Chicago, IL
Jan 2, 1979*		Georgia Tech	W 77–71	9–2	Alumni Hall; Chicago, IL
Jan 6, 1979*		Air Force	W 86–66	10–2	Alumni Hall; Chicago, IL
Jan 9, 1979*		at Providence	W 84–75	11–2	Dunkin' Donuts Center; Providence, RI
Jan 13, 1979*		Loyola (IL)	W 80–73	12–2	Alumni Hall; Chicago, IL
Jan 20, 1979*		at Dayton	L 64–68	12–3	University of Dayton Arena; Dayton, OH
Jan 27, 1979*		at Illinois State	W 87–69	13–3	Horton Field House; Normal, IL
Jan 31, 1979*		at Western Michigan	L 80–82	13–4	University Arena; Kalamazoo, MI
Feb 3, 1979*		at Oral Roberts	W 75–72	14–4	Mabee Center; Tulsa, OK
Feb 8, 1979*		at Loyola (IL)	W 77–73	15–4	Alumni Gym; Chicago, IL
Feb 10, 1979*		Centenary	W 82–66	16–4	Alumni Hall; Chicago, IL
Feb 14, 1979*		at Ball State	W 85–76	17–4	Irving Gymnasium; Muncie, IN
Feb 17, 1979*		at Villanova	W 69–66	18–4	The Palestra; Philadelphia, PA
Feb 21, 1979*	No. 20	Valparaiso	W 104–76	19–4	Alumni Hall; Chicago, IL
Feb 24, 1979*	No. 20	No. 9 Marquette	W 61–60	20–4	Alumni Hall; Chicago, IL
Feb 27, 1979*	No. 15	UAB	W 88–66	21–4	Alumni Hall (3,113); Chicago, IL
Mar 2, 1979*	No. 15	No. 2 Notre Dame	W 76–72	22–4	Alumni Hall; Chicago, IL
Mar 5, 1979*	No. 8	Loyola (IL)	L 99–101	22–5	Alumni Hall; Chicago, IL
NCAA Tournament
Mar 11, 1979*	(2 W) No. 6	vs. (7 W) USC; Second Round	W 89–78	23–5	Pauley Pavilion; Los Angeles, CA
Mar 15, 1979*	(2 W) No. 6	vs. (3 W) No. 10 Marquette; Regional semifinal	W 62–56	24–5	Marriott Center; Provo, UT
Mar 17, 1979*	(2 W) No. 6	vs. (1 W) No. 2 UCLA; Regional final	W 95–91	25–5	Marriott Center; Provo, UT
Mar 24, 1979*	(2 W) No. 6	vs. (1 MW) No. 1 Indiana State; National semifinal	L 74–76	25–6	Special Events Center; Salt Lake City, UT
Mar 26, 1979*	(2 W) No. 6	vs. (9 E) No. 14 Penn; Consolation Game	W 96–93 ^{OT}	26–6	Special Events Center; Salt Lake City, UT
*Non-conference game. ^{#}Rankings from AP Poll. (#) Tournament seedings in parentheses. W=West.

== Rankings ==
Ranking movements Legend: ██ Increase in ranking ██ Decrease in ranking — = Not ranked
	Week																
Poll	Pre	1	2	3	4	5	6	7	8	9	10	11	12	13	14	15	Final
AP	—	—	—	—	—	—	—	—	—	—	—	—	—	20	15	8	6
Coaches	—	—	—	—	—	—	—	—	—	—	—	—	—	20	11	8	Not released

^Coaches did not release Week 1 or Week 2 polls.

== Awards and honors ==
- Ray Meyer – NABC Coach of the Year
