= 1978–79 Detroit Titans men's basketball team =

American college basketball season

1978–79 Detroit Titans men's basketball
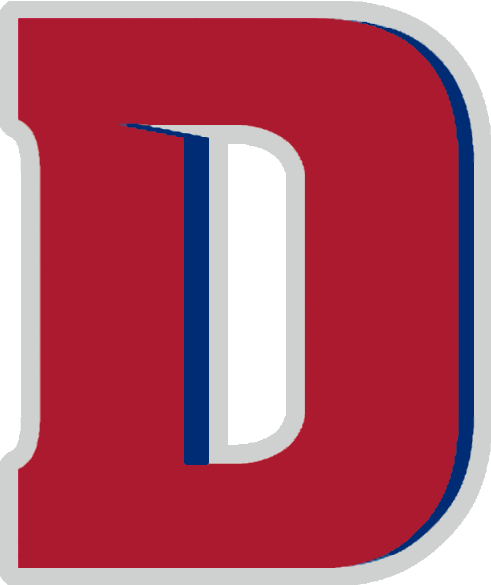

NCAA tournament
- Conference: Independent
- Record: 22–6
- Head coach: Smokey Gaines (2nd season)
- Home arena: Calihan Hall

1978–79 NCAA Division I men's basketball independents standings
	Conf.				Overall
Team	W		L	PCT	W		L	PCT
No. 8 Syracuse		–		–	26	–	4	.867
Georgetown		–		–	24	–	5	.828
No. 6 DePaul		–		–	26	–	6	.813
No. 4 Notre Dame		–		–	24	–	6	.800
VCU		–		–	20	–	5	.800
Iona		–		–	23	–	6	.793
Detroit		–		–	22	–	6	.786
Tennessee State		–		–	20	–	6	.769
Old Dominion		–		–	23	–	7	.767
No. 10 Marquette		–		–	22	–	7	.759
Wagner		–		–	21	–	7	.750
Connecticut		–		–	21	–	8	.724
UNLV		–		–	21	–	8	.724
UNC Wilmington		–		–	19	–	8	.704
Boston College		–		–	21	–	9	.700
James Madison		–		–	18	–	8	.692
Rhode Island		–		–	20	–	9	.690
George Mason		–		–	17	–	8	.680
St. Bonaventure		–		–	19	–	9	.679
Illinois State		–		–	20	–	10	.667
St. John's		–		–	21	–	11	.656
Dayton		–		–	19	–	10	.655
Boston University		–		–	17	–	9	.654
Fairfield		–		–	17	–	9	.654
Georgia Tech		–		–	17	–	9	.654
Oral Roberts		–		–	17	–	10	.630
Holy Cross		–		–	17	–	11	.607
Seton Hall		–		–	16	–	11	.593
Cleveland State		–		–	15	–	10	.600
East Tennessee State		–		–	16	–	11	.593
Maine		–		–	14	–	10	.583
UAB		–		–	15	–	11	.577
Army		–		–	14	–	11	.560
Denver		–		–	15	–	12	.556
South Carolina		–		–	15	–	12	.556
Stetson		–		–	15	–	12	.556
Siena		–		–	14	–	12	.538
St. Francis (NY)		–		–	14	–	12	.538
Navy		–		–	13	–	12	.520
Xavier		–		–	14	–	13	.519
Northeastern		–		–	13	–	13	.500
Saint Francis (PA)		–		–	13	–	13	.500
Robert Morris		–		–	13	–	14	.481
Southern Miss		–		–	13	–	14	.481
Air Force		–		–	12	–	13	.480
Long Island University		–		–	12	–	13	.480
Canisius		–		–	12	–	14	.462
Colgate		–		–	12	–	14	.462
Evansville		–		–	13	–	16	.448
East Carolina		–		–	12	–	15	.444
Loyola-Chicago		–		–	12	–	15	.444
Butler		–		–	11	–	16	.407
North Texas State		–		–	11	–	16	.407
Saint Peter's		–		–	10	–	15	.400
Campbell		–		–	10	–	16	.385
New Hampshire		–		–	10	–	16	.385
Providence		–		–	10	–	16	.385
Richmond		–		–	10	–	16	.385
Hawaii		–		–	10	–	17	.370
William & Mary		–		–	9	–	17	.346
Georgia Southern		–		–	9	–	18	.333
Fairleigh Dickinson		–		–	8	–	18	.308
Wisconsin-Milwaukee		–		–	8	–	18	.308
Vermont		–		–	8	–	18	.308
Northwestern State		–		–	7	–	19	.269
Fordham		–		–	7	–	22	.241
Catholic		–		–	6	–	20	.231
Arkansas-Little Rock		–		–	6	–	20	.231
Manhattan		–		–	6	–	20	.231
Niagara		–		–	6	–	20	.231
Portland State		–		–	6	–	21	.222
Baltimore		–		–	4	–	20	.167
Valparaiso		–		–	4	–	21	.160
Baptist		–		–	2	–	25	.074
Rankings from AP Poll

The 1978–79 Detroit Titans men's basketball team represented the University of Detroit in the 1978–79 NCAA Division I men's basketball season. The team played at Calihan Hall in Detroit.

The Titans were led by second-year head coach Smokey Gaines, a former assistant coach for Dick Vitale, who stepped down prior to the season as Athletic Director for the university to take the head coaching position for the Detroit Pistons of the NBA. After missing out on an NCAA bid the previous season, and the losses of guard John Long and forward Terry Tyler, Detroit was led by returning guards Terry Duerod and Wilbert McCormick and Detroit native and Robert Morris transfer Earl Cureton.

Detroit struggled out of the gate with 6-3 record, but two late season wins over ranked opponents elevate the season, with wins over #9 Georgetown, 91-71, and #9 Marquette, 64-63, as Terry Duerod hit a jumper with two second left to secure the win. The Titans received an at-large bid to the NCAA tournament, seeded 7th. Detroit fell to No. 10 seed Lamar in the opening round, 95-87, as Cardinal Clarence Kea scored 33 points with 19 rebounds to lead Lamar. Detroit finished the season with a 22–6 record.

On the season, Duerod led the team with 23.3 ppg, Cureton added 11.7 ppg and 9 rpg, freshman Jerry Davis added 11.6 ppg, and McCormick contributed 11.4 ppg and 6.6 apg. After the season, Gaines would be hired to coach San Diego State and Duerod would be drafted in the 3rd round by the Detroit Pistons in 1979 NBA draft. Duerod was inducted in the University of Detroit Athletics Hall of Fame in 1993 alongside former coach Dick Vitale. Earl Cureton was honored in 2007.

== Roster ==
1978–79 Detroit Titans men's basketball team
Players
Coaches

Pos.	#	Name	Height	Weight	Year	Hometown
F		Earl Cureton	6 ft 9 in (2.06 m)	205 lb (93 kg)	Jr	Detroit, Michigan
G		Terry Duerod	6 ft 1 in (1.85 m)	175 lb (79 kg)	Sr	Royal Oak, Michigan
F		Jeff Whitlow	6 ft 6 in (1.98 m)	—	Sr
G		Wilbert McCormick	6 ft 0 in (1.83 m)	—	Jr
G		Dave Niles	6 ft 5 in (1.96 m)	—	Jr
F		Joe Kopicki	6 ft 9 in (2.06 m)	230 lb (104 kg)	Fr	Warren, Michigan
G		Jerry Davis	6 ft 5 in (1.96 m)	—	Fr
C		Keith Jackson	6 ft 9 in (2.06 m)	—	Sr
G		Garey Fields	6 ft 6 in (1.98 m)	—	Jr
G		Rich McDermott	6 ft 2 in (1.88 m)	—	Sr
G		Mario Benson	6 ft 2 in (1.88 m)	—	Fr
G		Arthur Bright	6 ft 5 in (1.96 m)	—	So

Head coach

- Smokey Gaines (LeMoyne–Owen)

Assistant coach(es)

Legend

- (C) Team captain
- (S) Suspended
- (I) Ineligible
- (W) Walk-on
- Injured
- Current redshirt

Roster

== Schedule and results ==
Date time, TV	Rank^{#}	Opponent^{#}	Result	Record	Site city, state
Regular Season
Nov 25, 1978*		Toledo	W 67–64	1–0	Calihan Hall; Detroit, Michigan
Dec 4, 1978*		at No. 14 North Carolina	L 76–93	1–1	Carmichael Auditorium; Chapel Hill, North Carolina
Dec 7, 1978*		at Oregon	W 75–74	2–1	McArthur Court; Eugene, Oregon
Dec 16, 1978*		at Ball State	L 81–82	2–2	Irving Gymnasium; Muncie, Indiana
Dec 19, 1978*		Marshall	W 92–61	3–2	Calihan Hall; Detroit, Michigan
Dec 21, 1978*		at Iona	W 76–72	4–2	John A. Mulcahy Campus Events Center; New Rochelle, New York
Dec 23, 1978*		Central Michigan	W 79–72	5–2	Calihan Hall; Detroit, Michigan
Dec 28, 1978*		New Hampshire	W 108–70	6–2	Calihan Hall; Detroit, Michigan
Dec 29, 1978*		Rhode Island	L 67–69	6–3	Calihan Hall; Detroit, Michigan
Jan 4, 1979*		at Long Island University	W 84–63	7–3	Schwartz Athletic Center; Brooklyn, New York
Jan 6, 1979*		at Rhode Island	W 77–76	8–3	Providence Civic Center; Kingston, Rhode Island
Jan 10, 1979*		Loyola (IL)	W 83–74	9–3	Calihan Hall; Detroit, Michigan
Jan 13, 1979*		Illinois State	W 92–81	10–3	Calihan Hall; Detroit, Michigan
Jan 15, 1979*		Western Michigan	W 92–77	11–3	Calihan Hall; Detroit, Michigan
Jan 18, 1979*		at East Carolina	W 81–69	12–3	Williams Arena at Minges Coliseum; Greenville, North Carolina
Jan 24, 1979*		Xavier	L 70–74	12–4	Calihan Hall; Detroit, Michigan
Jan 31, 1979*		at Eastern Michigan	W 80–75	13–4	Bowen Field House; Ypsilanti, Michigan
Feb 3, 1979*		No. 9 Georgetown	W 91–71	14–4	Calihan Hall; Detroit, Michigan
Feb 6, 1979*		at No. 9 Marquette	W 64–63	15–4	MECCA Arena; Milwaukee, Wisconsin
Feb 14, 1979*		St. Bonaventure	W 106–101	16–4	Calihan Hall; Detroit, Michigan
Feb 17, 1979*		Colgate	W 86–66	17–4	Calihan Hall; Detroit, Michigan
Feb 22, 1979*		at Duquesne	L 84–93	17–5	Civic Arena; Pittsburgh, Pennsylvania
Feb 24, 1979*		at Loyola (IL)	W 72–69	18–5	Alumni Gym; Chicago, Illinois
Feb 28, 1979*		Xavier	W 88–69	22–5	Calihan Hall; Detroit, Michigan
NCAA Tournament
Mar 9, 1979*	(7 ME)	vs. (10 ME) Lamar; First round	L 87–95	22–6	Murphy Center; Murfreesboro, Tennessee
*Non-conference game. ^{#}Rankings from AP Poll. (#) Tournament seedings in parentheses. ME=Mideast.
