= 1978–79 Georgetown Hoyas men's basketball team =

American college basketball season

1978–79 Georgetown Hoyas men's basketball

ECAC South-Upstate Region tournament champions

NCAA tournament, Second Round
- Conference: Independent

Ranking
- Coaches: No. 12
- Record: 24–5
- Head coach: John Thompson (7th season)
- Assistant coaches: Bill Stein (7th season); Bob Grier (2nd season)
- Captains: Steve Martin; Tom Scates
- Home arena: McDonough Gymnasium

1978–79 NCAA Division I men's basketball independents standings
	Conf.				Overall
Team	W		L	PCT	W		L	PCT
No. 8 Syracuse		–		–	26	–	4	.867
Georgetown		–		–	24	–	5	.828
No. 6 DePaul		–		–	26	–	6	.813
No. 4 Notre Dame		–		–	24	–	6	.800
VCU		–		–	20	–	5	.800
Iona		–		–	23	–	6	.793
Detroit		–		–	22	–	6	.786
Tennessee State		–		–	20	–	6	.769
Old Dominion		–		–	23	–	7	.767
No. 10 Marquette		–		–	22	–	7	.759
Wagner		–		–	21	–	7	.750
Connecticut		–		–	21	–	8	.724
UNLV		–		–	21	–	8	.724
UNC Wilmington		–		–	19	–	8	.704
Boston College		–		–	21	–	9	.700
James Madison		–		–	18	–	8	.692
Rhode Island		–		–	20	–	9	.690
George Mason		–		–	17	–	8	.680
St. Bonaventure		–		–	19	–	9	.679
Illinois State		–		–	20	–	10	.667
St. John's		–		–	21	–	11	.656
Dayton		–		–	19	–	10	.655
Boston University		–		–	17	–	9	.654
Fairfield		–		–	17	–	9	.654
Georgia Tech		–		–	17	–	9	.654
Oral Roberts		–		–	17	–	10	.630
Holy Cross		–		–	17	–	11	.607
Seton Hall		–		–	16	–	11	.593
Cleveland State		–		–	15	–	10	.600
East Tennessee State		–		–	16	–	11	.593
Maine		–		–	14	–	10	.583
UAB		–		–	15	–	11	.577
Army		–		–	14	–	11	.560
Denver		–		–	15	–	12	.556
South Carolina		–		–	15	–	12	.556
Stetson		–		–	15	–	12	.556
Siena		–		–	14	–	12	.538
St. Francis (NY)		–		–	14	–	12	.538
Navy		–		–	13	–	12	.520
Xavier		–		–	14	–	13	.519
Northeastern		–		–	13	–	13	.500
Saint Francis (PA)		–		–	13	–	13	.500
Robert Morris		–		–	13	–	14	.481
Southern Miss		–		–	13	–	14	.481
Air Force		–		–	12	–	13	.480
Long Island University		–		–	12	–	13	.480
Canisius		–		–	12	–	14	.462
Colgate		–		–	12	–	14	.462
Evansville		–		–	13	–	16	.448
East Carolina		–		–	12	–	15	.444
Loyola-Chicago		–		–	12	–	15	.444
Butler		–		–	11	–	16	.407
North Texas State		–		–	11	–	16	.407
Saint Peter's		–		–	10	–	15	.400
Campbell		–		–	10	–	16	.385
New Hampshire		–		–	10	–	16	.385
Providence		–		–	10	–	16	.385
Richmond		–		–	10	–	16	.385
Hawaii		–		–	10	–	17	.370
William & Mary		–		–	9	–	17	.346
Georgia Southern		–		–	9	–	18	.333
Fairleigh Dickinson		–		–	8	–	18	.308
Wisconsin-Milwaukee		–		–	8	–	18	.308
Vermont		–		–	8	–	18	.308
Northwestern State		–		–	7	–	19	.269
Fordham		–		–	7	–	22	.241
Catholic		–		–	6	–	20	.231
Arkansas-Little Rock		–		–	6	–	20	.231
Manhattan		–		–	6	–	20	.231
Niagara		–		–	6	–	20	.231
Portland State		–		–	6	–	21	.222
Baltimore		–		–	4	–	20	.167
Valparaiso		–		–	4	–	21	.160
Baptist		–		–	2	–	25	.074
Rankings from AP Poll

The 1978–79 Georgetown Hoyas men's basketball team represented Georgetown University during the 1978–79 NCAA Division I college basketball season. John Thompson, coached them in his seventh season as head coach. An independent, Georgetown played its home games at McDonough Gymnasium on the Georgetown campus in Washington, D.C., and finished the season with a record of 24–5. The team won the ECAC South-Upstate Region tournament championship, earning its first NCAA tournament bid since 1976. The Hoyas received a first-round bye and lost in the second round to Rutgers.

== Season recap ==
The Hoyas began the year with an exhibition game against the Chinese national team, a game made possible by co-sponsorship by the National Committee on United States–China Relations of a five-game tour of the United States by the Chinese men's and women's teams. Georgetown was the Chinese men's team fourth stop on their tour, and they defeated the Hoyas behind the play of center Mu Tieh-chu, conservatively estimated at 7 feet 2 inches (218 cm) in height and nicknamed "The Great Wall of China" by the U.S. players he faced.

Back from a summer playing overseas with an Eastern College Athletic Conference (ECAC) all-star team, junior guard John Duren took the lead on the court as point guard again this season. He averaged 14.6 points, 5.4 assists, and 35.3 minutes played per game during the season and played eight complete games, setting a single-season school record of 1,024 minutes played, and shot nearly 50 percent from the field and 83 percent from the free-throw line. In the final game of the regular season on February 24, 1979, he scored 22 points and had six assists against Holy Cross.

Junior forward Craig "Big Sky" Shelton led the team in rebounds and shooting percentage, shooting 60% from the field for the season. Against Oral Roberts on January 31, 1979, he had a season-high 26 points and 12 rebounds.

Freshman guard Eric "Sleepy" Floyd did not start in the first two games of the season, but he scored 28 points against Maryland on November 28, 1978, in the second game. He started the season's third game, against St. Bonaventure on December 2, the first of 128 consecutive starts he made for the Hoyas. Against Holy Cross in the regular-season finale, he grabbed 14 rebounds, a record for a Georgetown guard, later matched by Perry McDonald but never exceeded. During the season, he scored in double figures 26 times, shot 81.3 percent from the free throw line, and ended the season with a 15-for-15 free throw streak. He finished the season as the team's leading scorer, and set a freshman record of 480 points scored. Floyd was destined to become one of the great players in Georgetown history, leading the team in scoring in each of his four seasons.

Senior forward and team co-captain Steve Martin provided experienced leadership to the team. He scored 20 points against St. Bonaventure and 20 against Indiana, had 14 points and shot 10-for-11 (90.9%) from the free-throw line against Boston College, scored 20 points against George Washington, and scored in double figures in each of the team's last six games before its appearance in the 1979 NCAA Division I men's basketball tournament.

Although retaining its status as an independent, Georgetown was in its fifth season as a member of the Eastern College Athletic Conference (ECAC), a loosely organized sports federation that held three regional post-season Division I basketball tournaments in 1979 for independent Eastern colleges and universities similar to the end-of-season conference tournaments held by conventional college basketball conferences, with each tournament winner receiving an at-large bid to the 1979 NCAA basketball tournament. The Hoyas had won their regional tournament in 1975 and 1976 to earn an NCAA Tournament bid, but had been knocked out of their ECAC tournament in the semifinals the past two years and had to settle for a berth in the National Invitation Tournament. This season, they played in the ECAC South-Upstate Region tournament. After defeating Old Dominion in the semifinal, they met No.6-ranked Syracuse in the final. John Duren had 17 points, six assists, and seven steals and the Hoyas scored on 30 free throws to Syracuse's six. The Hoyas upset Syracuse to win their third ECAC regional tournament championship in five years and earn their first NCAA Tournament bid since 1976.

In the first of 14 consecutive Georgetown NCAA Tournament appearances, the Hoyas were the No. 3 seed in the East Region of the 1979 NCAA Tournament. They received a first-round bye, but were upset in the second round by the region's No. 6 seed, 18th-ranked Rutgers. It was the second straight year that the Scarlet Knights had defeated the Hoyas in a postseason tournament.

As a team, the Hoyas shot 51 percent from the field during the season. They finished the season unranked in the Associated Press Poll but ranked 12th in the final Coaches' Poll.

This was Georgetown's 38th and final season of play as an independent after the dissolution of the Eastern Intercollegiate Conference at the end of the 1938–39 season, and it also saw Georgetown's final appearance in an ECAC tournament. In the following season, the Hoyas would play as one of the seven founding members of the new Big East Conference, which held its own end-of-season tournament.

== Roster ==
#	Name	Height	Weight (lbs.)	Position	Class	Hometown	Previous team(s)
11	John Irwin	6'0"	N/A	G	Jr.	Larchmont, NY, U.S.	Mamaroneck HS
20	Steve Martin	6'4"	175	F	Sr.	New Orleans, LA, U.S.	St. Augustine HS
21	Eric "Sleepy" Floyd	6'3"	170	G	Fr.	Gastonia, NC, U.S.	Hunter Huss HS
24	Lonnie Duren	6'1"	N/A	G	Jr.	Washington, DC, U.S.	Augusta Military Academy (Fort Defiance, VA)
30	Ron Blaylock	6'3"	N/A	G	Fr.	Winston-Salem, NC, U.S.	East Forsyth HS
32	Eric Smith	6'5"	185	F	Fr.	Potomac, MD, U.S.	Winston Churchill HS
33	Craig "Big Sky" Shelton	6'7"	210	F	Jr.	Washington, DC, U.S.	Dunbar HS
34	Terry Fenlon	6'2"	N/A	G	Jr.	Washington, DC, U.S.	Mount St. Mary's University
40	Mike Hancock	6'7"	180	F/C	Fr.	Washington, DC, U.S.	Roosevelt Senior HS
41	Jeff Bullis	6'7"	205	F	Fr.	Forest Hill, MD, U.S.	Bel Air HS
44	John Duren	6'3"	150	G	Jr.	Washington, DC, U.S.	Dunbar HS
50	Ed Spriggs	6'9"	240	C/F	Fr.	North Brentwood, MD, U.S.	Northwestern HS
55	Tom Scates	6'11"	N/A	C	Sr.	Alexandria, VA, U.S.	St. Anthony's HS, (Washington, DC)

== Rankings ==
Ranking movement Legend: ██ Improvement in ranking. ██ Decrease in ranking. ██ Not ranked the previous week. RV=Others receiving votes.
Poll	Pre	Wk 1	Wk 2	Wk 3	Wk 4	Wk 5	Wk 6	Wk 7	Wk 8	Wk 9	Wk 10	Wk 11	Wk 12	Wk 13	Wk 14	Wk 15	Final
AP			20	16	14	15	12	14	10	11	9	18	16	17	16	11	
Coaches		– (Note: No Coaches' Poll this week.)	–	15	14	12	18	16	14	12	10	19	16	16	15	12	–

== 1978–79 schedule and results ==
Sources.

- All times are Eastern

Date time, TV	Rank^{#}	Opponent^{#}	Result	Record	Site (attendance) city, state
Exhibition
Thu., Nov. 16, 1978 no, no		Chinese National Team	L 69–75	—	McDonough Gymnasium; Washington, DC
Regular season
Sat., Nov. 25, 1978 no, no		Bowie State	W 79–54	1-0	McDonough Gymnasium (2,130); Washington, DC
Tue., Nov. 28, 1978 no, no		vs. No. 19 Maryland	W 68–65	2-0	Capital Centre (8,100); Landover, MD
Sat., Dec. 2, 1978 no, no		St. Bonaventure	W 71–59	3-0	McDonough Gymnasium (4,000); Washington, DC
Wed., Dec. 6, 1978 no, no	No. 20	Indiana	W 60–54	4-0	Capital Centre (7,800); Landover, MD
Sat., Dec. 9, 1978 no, no	No. 20	at St. John's	W 77–71	5-0	Alumni Hall (4,394); Queens, NY
Sat., Dec. 16, 1978 no, no	No. 16	St. Mary's (MD)	W 96–58	6-0	McDonough Gymnasium (N/A); Washington, DC
Wed., Dec. 20, 1978 no, no	No. 14	vs. Fresno State; Wolf Pack Tournament	W 49–42	7-0	Centennial Coliseum (5,662); Reno, NV
Thu., Dec. 21, 1978 no, no	No. 14	at Nevada; Wolf Pack Tournament	L 77–87	7-1	Centennial Coliseum (6,077); Reno, NV
Wed., Dec. 27, 1978 no, no	No. 15	Southern	W 97–58	8-1	McDonough Gymnasium (2,438); Washington, DC
Sat., Dec. 30, 1978 no, no	No. 15	District of Columbia	W 86–56	9-1	McDonough Gymnasium (N/A); Washington, DC
Tue., Jan. 2, 1979 no, no	No. 15	Saint Joseph's	L 36–37	9-2	McDonough Gymnasium (2,470); Washington, DC
Sat., Jan. 6, 1979 no, no	No. 12	Samford	W 73–50	10-2	McDonough Gymnasium (1,475); Washington, DC
Wed., Jan. 10, 1979 no, no	No. 14	North Carolina Central	W 107–72	11-2	McDonough Gymnasium (1,075); Washington, DC
Sat., Jan. 13, 1979 no, no	No. 14	Manhattan	W 78–64	12-2	McDonough Gymnasium (3,120); Washington, DC
Thu., Jan. 18, 1979 no, no	No. 10	Fordham	W 75–65	13-2	McDonough Gymnasium (4,000); Washington, DC
Sat., Jan. 20, 1979 no, no	No. 10	at Penn	W 78–76	14-2	The Palestra (9,208); Philadelphia, PA
Tue., Jan. 23, 1979 no, no	No. 11	Saint Francis (PA)	W 74–62	15-2	McDonough Gymnasium (3,280); Washington, D.C.
Sat., Jan. 27, 1979 no, no	No. 11	at American	W 88–80	16-2	Fort Myer Gymnasium (4,000); Arlington, VA
Wed., Jan. 31, 1979 no, no	No. 9	Oral Roberts	L 74–75	16-3	McDonough Gymnasium (3,879); Washington, DC
Sat., Feb. 3, 1979 no, no	No. 9	at Detroit	L 71–91	16-4	Memorial Hall (N/A); Detroit, MI
Wed., Feb. 7, 1979 no, no	No. 18	at Saint Peter's	W 62–60	17-4	Yanitelli Center (N/A); Jersey City, NJ
Sat., Feb. 10, 1979 no, no	No. 18	Seton Hall	W 87–62	18-4	McDonough Gymnasium (4,500); Washington, DC
wed., Feb. 14, 1979 no, no	No. 16	Stonehill	W 69–59	19-4	McDonough Gymnasium (N/A); Washington, DC
Sat., Feb. 17, 1979 no, no	No. 16	Boston College	W 84–81	20-4	McDonough Gymnasium (4,500); Washington, DC
Wed., Feb. 21, 1979 no, no	No. 16	at George Washington	W 73–71	21-4	Charles E. Smith Athletic Center (5,000); Washington, DC
Sat., Feb. 24, 1979 no, no	No. 17	at Holy Cross	W 63–54	22-4	Hart Center (4,000); Worcester, MA
ECAC South-Upstate Region tournament
Sat., Mar. 3, 1979 no, no	No. 16	vs. Old Dominion; ECAC South-Upstate Semifinal	W 73–52	23-4	Richmond Coliseum (6,150); Richmond, VA
Mon., Mar. 5, 1979 no, no	No. 16	vs. No. 6 Syracuse; ECAC South-Upstate Final/Rivalry	W 66–58	24-4	Cole Field House (N/A); College Park, MD
NCAA tournament
Sat., Mar. 10, 1979 no, no	No. 11	vs. No. 18 Rutgers; East Region Second Round	L 58–64	24-5	Providence Civic Center (12,150); Providence, RI
*Non-conference game. ^{#}Rankings from AP Poll. (#) Tournament seedings in parentheses.
