= ECAC Tournament =

ECAC Tournament may refer to:

- ECAC Hockey Men's Ice Hockey Tournament, the collegiate conference ice hockey tournament for ECAC Hockey
- ECAC Men's Basketball Tournaments, various end-of-season collegiate men's basketball tournaments organized by the Eastern College Athletic Association since 1973
- ECAC North men's basketball tournament, the post-season men's basketball tournament held annually by the ECAC North Conference from 1980 through 1988, prior to it being renamed the America East Conference

See also

- America East men's basketball tournament
