= Scott Thompson (basketball coach) =

American basketball coach

Biographical details
- Born: Chicago, Illinois, U.S.

Playing career
- 1972–1976: Iowa
- Position: Shooting guard

Coaching career (HC unless noted)
- 1977–1980: Notre Dame (assistant)
- 1980–1983: Iowa (assistant)
- 1983–1987: Arizona (assistant)
- 1987–1992: Rice
- 1992–1996: Wichita State
- 1996–2000: Cornell

Head coaching record
- Overall: 150–209 (.418)
- Tournaments: 0–1 (NIT)

Scott Thompson (born May 27, 1954) is an American former college basketball coach. He was the head coach at Rice University from 1987 to 1992, Wichita State University from 1992 to 1996 and Cornell University from 1996 to 2000.

He served as Senior Vice President for Special Campaigns at the University of Florida Foundation. In 2017, he became the National Ambassador for Coaches vs. Cancer at the American Cancer Society.

== Head coaching record ==
Record table
Season	Team	Overall	Conference	Standing	Postseason
Rice Owls (Southwest Conference) (1987–1992)
1987–88	Rice	6–21	3–13	T–8th	
1988–89	Rice	12–16	6–10	8th	
1989–90	Rice	11–17	5–11	7th	
1990–91	Rice	16–14	9–7	T–4th	NIT First Round
1991–92	Rice	20–11	8–6	4th	
Rice:		65–79 (.451)	31–47 (.397)		
Wichita State Shockers (Missouri Valley Conference) (1992–1996)
1992–93	Wichita State	10–17	7–11	T–7th	
1993–94	Wichita State	9–18	6–12	T–7th	
1994–95	Wichita State	13–14	6–12	8th	
1995–96	Wichita State	8–21	4–14	T–10th	
Wichita State:		40–70 (.364)	23–49 (.319)		
Cornell Big Red (Ivy League) (1996–2000)
1996–97	Cornell	15–11	7–7	5th	
1997–98	Cornell	9–17	6–8	T–4th	
1998–99	Cornell	11–15	6–8	5th	
1999–00	Cornell	10–17	3–11	8th	
Cornell:		45–60 (.429)	22–34 (.393)		
Total:		150–209 (.418)			
