= Jim Sweeney (basketball) =

American basketball player

Personal information
- Listed height: 6 ft 0 in (1.83 m)

Career information
- High school: Lawrenceville School (Lawrenceville, New Jersey)
- College: Boston College (1976–1980)
- NBA draft: 1980: undrafted
- Position: Point guard

Career history
- Sweden

Career highlights
- Frances Pomeroy Naismith Award (1980)

James Sweeney was a 1980 recipient of the Frances Pomeroy Naismith Award as the United States' top collegiate basketball player under 6'0" tall.

== Basketball ==
He was the captain of the Boston College Eagles. He was nominated by Boston College (BC) as a Rhodes Scholar candidate. Raised in Trenton, New Jersey, he attended the Lawrenceville School before receiving an athletic scholarship to Boston College.

Sweeney testified as a witness in the 1978–79 Boston College basketball point shaving scandal in which members of organized crime schemed to control the outcomes of several games. Sweeney was neither charged nor offered immunity in exchange for his testimony. The Tampa Bay Times featured Sweeney as one of the "Top 10 most intriguing people of Tampa Bay in 2014", for their fellow resident having displayed "little fear of the mob and no bitterness about getting caught up in a wise-guy point-shaving scheme."

Sweeney's role in the scandal caused the NBA to reject his application to play in any of its teams as a first-time draft during the 1980–81 season. Following his 1980 graduation from BC, Sweeney played basketball briefly in Sweden.

== Post-basketball career ==
Sweeney spent the years after his time in Sweden as a manufacturer's rep in the computer industry. While still in his forties, Sweeney and his wife closed their computer firm to launch New Vision Entertainment, a Florida-based company focused on the development and promotion of entertainment properties that positively impact culture.

Creating a trademarked sports personality named MIKE (for "microphone"), Sweeney launched a series of MIKE Sports Comic Books, and regularly blogs under the same pen name. Sweeney's creative sports writing and reflections on his Boston College basketball past were covered in Forbes magazine.

Sweeney continued to play basketball domestically and abroad through the masters basketball circuit.

Jim Sweeney continues to compete in U.S. and international masters basketball tournaments and serves as head of USA for FIMBA, the international masters basketball organization based out of Buenos Aires, Argentina. He has been featured as an active, global masters athlete in the January 14, 2018 on-line issue of Parade magazine.

In 2020, Jim chronicled the history of masters basketball and his experiences competing in over 100 tournaments with an Amazon book release of Old School Hoops: Stories of an Aging Baller.

== Family ==
Sweeney married fellow BC classmate Maura (Haggerty) Sweeney in 1981, and together they have one daughter. The couple resides in Clearwater, Florida.

== See also ==
- List of people banned or suspended by the NBA
