= ECAC men's basketball tournaments =

Men's postseason college basketball tournaments in the United States

The ECAC men's basketball tournaments are postseason college basketball tournaments organized by the Eastern College Athletic Conference (ECAC) in the United States.

Despite its name, the ECAC is not a traditional athletic conference, but rather a loosely organized sports federation for colleges and universities in the northeastern United States. Among other things, it organizes end-of-season college basketball tournaments for member schools which are not members of a traditional conference, or which do not otherwise have access to such a tournament. At various times, it has organized end-of-season basketball tournaments at the National Collegiate Athletic Association (NCAA) Division I, Division II, and Division III levels. The Division I tournaments it organized from 1975 through 1981 were the only college basketball tournaments which gave independent colleges and universities in the northeastern United States automatic bids to the NCAA Tournament during those years.

== Division I ==
From 1975 to 1981, the ECAC organized annual regional end-of-season men's basketball tournaments for independent Division I ECAC member colleges and universities in the northeastern United States. The winner of each regional tournament was declared the ECAC regional champion for the season and received an automatic bid in the NCAA Division I men's basketball tournament.

Before 1975, the ECAC had not organized such tournaments for Division I schools; the NCAA tournament invited only one team per Division I conference and accommodated independents with a limited number of at-large bids. In 1975, however, the NCAA tournament's field expanded to 32 teams, including the champions of end-of-season conference tournaments, who received automatic bids. Although a number of at-large bids still existed, the process for selecting the field for the 1975 NCAA tournament included many second-place conference teams and threatened to exclude independent schools in the northeastern United States, which had no end-of-season conference tournament to play in and therefore no automatic bids. With no conventional athletic conferences yet in existence in the Northeast, the ECAC began to organize its Division I basketball tournaments in 1975, allowing northeastern independents to retain their independent status while still having an opportunity to play in an end-of-season tournament offering an automatic bid. The ECAC Division I tournaments thus assured that at least some northeastern colleges and universities would receive NCAA tournament bids.

In both 1975 and 1976, the ECAC organized four regional Division I tournaments: Metro (for the New York City area and New Jersey); New England (for the New England area); South (for Pennsylvania, Maryland, Virginia, West Virginia, and Washington, D.C.); and Upstate (for Upstate New York). As northeastern independent colleges and universities began to join existing conferences or form new ones and play in their own end-of-season conference tournaments, the number of ECAC regional tournaments declined due to reduced demand for them. After the formation of the Eastern Collegiate Basketball League (which later became the Atlantic 10 Conference), the ECAC combined its Southern and Upstate Regions into a single "Southern" (later "Upstate-Southern" and "South-Upstate") Region and held only three regional tournaments in 1977, 1978, and 1979. After the teams that played in the New England region all joined the original Big East Conference, the Atlantic 10 Conference, or the new ECAC North Conference (which later became the America East Conference), the ECAC also did away with its New England tournament, and in 1980 and 1981 it held only two tournaments, Metro and Southern.

After the conclusion of play in 1981, some of the teams in the Metro Region formed the Metro Atlantic Athletic Conference (MAAC) and others formed the ECAC Metro Conference (which later became the Northeast Conference), while the ECAC South Region teams formed the ECAC South Conference (which later became the Colonial Athletic Association and later still the Coastal Athletic Association). With all the former independents in the northeastern United States having joined a traditional conference holding its own end-of-season tournament, and with the National Invitation Tournament providing a means of postseason tournament play for Division I teams not invited to the NCAA tournament, the ECAC had no reason to continue its Division I basketball tournament series, and it ceased to organize such tournaments after 1981.

=== 1975 tournaments ===
National rankings indicated.

==== Regional champions ====
Champions
Metro: #20 Rutgers
New England: Boston College
Southern: Georgetown
Upstate: Syracuse

==== Brackets ====
Sources
Metro

Semifinals, March 6, 1975; Madison Square Garden, New York, NY
St. John's	76
Seton Hall	64
Saint Peter's	63
#20 Rutgers	80

Finals, March 8, 1975; Madison Square Garden, New York, NY
St. John's	77
#20 Rutgers	79
Third place
Seton Hall	75
Saint Peter's	79

New England

Semifinals, March 6, 1975; Springfield Civic Center, Springfield, MA
Connecticut	58
Boston College	68
Providence	55
Holy Cross	62

Finals, March 8, 1975; Springfield Civic Center, Springfield, MA
Boston College	69
Holy Cross	55
Third place
Connecticut	83
Providence	108

Southern

Semifinals, March 7, 1975; WVU Coliseum, Morgantown, WV
George Washington	59
Georgetown	66
West Virginia	75
Pittsburgh	73

Finals, March 8, 1975; WVU Coliseum, Morgantown, WV
Georgetown	62
West Virginia	61
Third place
George Washington	64
Pittsburgh	89

Upstate

Semifinals, March 7, 1975; Buffalo Memorial Auditorium, Buffalo, NY
St. Bonaventure	78
Fairfield	73
Niagara	72
Syracuse	90

Finals, March 8, 1975; Buffalo Memorial Auditorium, Buffalo, NY
Saint Bonaventure	81
Syracuse	100
Third place
Fairfield	67
Niagara	72

=== 1976 tournaments ===
National rankings indicated.

==== Regional champions ====
Champions
Metro:: #3 Rutgers
New England: Connecticut
Southern: Georgetown
Upstate: Syracuse

==== Brackets ====
Metro

Semifinals, March 4, 1976; Jadwin Gymnasium, Princeton, NJ
#14 St. John's	75
St. Peter's	67
#3 Rutgers	104
Long Island-Brooklyn	76

Finals, March 6, 1976; Jadwin Gymnasium, Princeton, NJ
#14 St. John's	67
#3 Rutgers	70
Third place
Saint Peter's	76
Long Island-Brooklyn	65

New England

Semifinals, March 4, 1976; Springfield Civic Center, Springfield, MA
Connecticut	73
Massachusetts	69
Providence	64
Holy Cross	61

Finals, March 6, 1976; Springfield Civic Center, Springfield, MA
Connecticut	87
Providence	73
Third place
Massachusetts	75
Holy Cross	88

Southern

Semifinals, March 5, 1976; WVU Coliseum, Morgantown, WV
Georgetown	72
Villanova	59
George Washington	99
West Virginia	97

Finals, March 7, 1976; WVU Coliseum, Morgantown, WV
Georgetown	68
George Washington	63
Third place
Villanova	64
West Virginia	87

Upstate

Semifinals, March 4, 1976; Manley Field House, Syracuse, NY
St. Bonaventure	66
Niagara	67
Manhattan	57
Syracuse	83

Finals, March 6, 1976; Manley Field House, Syracuse, NY
Niagara	68
Syracuse	77
Third place
St. Bonaventure	84
Manhattan	74

=== 1977 tournaments ===
National rankings indicated.

==== Regional champions ====
Champions
Metro:: St. John's
New England: Holy Cross
Southern: #13 Syracuse

==== Brackets ====
Source
Metro

Semifinals, March 3, 1977; Campus sites (see note)
Manhattan	64
St. John's	73
Army	71
Seton Hall	77

Finals, March 5, 1977; Madison Square Garden, New York, NY
St. John's	83
Seton Hall	73
Third place
Manhattan	62
Army	64

Note: The Manhattan-St. John's semifinal game was held at Rose Hill Gymnasium, Bronx, NY. The Army-Seton Hall semifinal game took place at Yanitelli Center, Jersey City, NJ.

New England

Semifinals, March 3, 1977; Hartford Civic Center, Hartford, CT
Connecticut	77
Holy Cross	89
Fairfield	31
#8 Providence	44

Finals, March 5, 1977; Hartford Civic Center, Hartford, CT
Holy Cross	68
#8 Providence	67
Third place
Connecticut	72
Fairfield	66

The 1977 New England Tournament's semifinal games contrasted with one another greatly: Holy Cross, led by freshman guard Ronnie Perry, played a hard, physical game – with 45 free throws in the second half, 24 by Holy Cross and 21 by Connecticut – to defeat Connecticut 89-77, while Providence, led by senior guard Joe Hassett, found its offense lacking and used tough defensive play to overcome Fairfield 44-31. The much-anticipated championship game that followed – a rematch of the December 1976 Colonial Classic final played at the Boston Garden, in which Holy Cross had handed Providence one of only three losses the Friars suffered all season on a game-winning last-second shot by the Crusaders' Chris Potter – was played before a sold-out crowd at the Hartford Civic Center and was one of the greatest games in the eight-season history of the ECAC Division I tournaments. With less than a minute to play and his team behind, Holy Cross's Michael Vicens stole the ball along his own end line and raced down the court to score on a reverse dunk. This energized both the crowd and the Holy Cross players and swung the game's momentum in favor of Holy Cross. The Crusaders got the ball with less than 10 seconds to go, and Potter scored on an 18-foot (5.5-meter) jumper with five seconds remaining to again give Holy Cross a win, 68-67. Holy Cross thus won an automatic bid to the 1977 NCAA Division I men's basketball tournament and made its first appearance in that tournament since 1956. Providence also reached the NCAA tournament via an at-large bid.

Southern

Semifinals, February 28, 1977; Campus sites (see note)
St. Bonaventure	72
#13 Syracuse	85
Old Dominion	80
Georgetown	58

Finals, March 3, 1977; Old Dominion University Fieldhouse, Norfolk, VA
#13 Syracuse	67
Old Dominion	64

Note: The St. Bonaventure-Syracuse semifinal game was held at Manley Field House, Syracuse, NY. The Old Dominion-Georgetown semifinal game took place at McDonough Gymnasium, Washington, DC.

=== 1978 tournaments ===
National rankings indicated.

==== Regional champions ====
Champions
Metro:: St. John's
New England: Rhode Island
Upstate-Southern: St. Bonaventure

==== Brackets ====
Metro

Semifinals, March 3, 1978; Nassau Coliseum, Uniondale, NY
St. John's	83
Iona	80
Army	81
Seton Hall	79

Finals, March 5, 1978; Nassau Coliseum, Uniondale, NY
St. John's	65
Army	63

New England

Semifinals, March 3, 1978; Providence Civic Center, Providence, RI
#18 Providence	71
Holy Cross	67
Rhode Island	71
Fairfield	69

Finals, March 5, 1978; Providence Civic Center, Providence, RI
#18 Providence	62
Rhode Island	65

Upstate-Southern

Semifinals, March 2, 1978; See note for locations
St. Bonaventure	70
#14 Syracuse	69
Virginia Commonwealth	88
#17 Georgetown	75

Finals, March 5, 1978; Rochester Community War Memorial, Rochester, NY
St. Bonaventure	63
Virginia Commonwealth	61

Note: The St. Bonaventure-Syracuse semifinal game was held at the Rochester Community War Memorial, Rochester, NY. The Virginia Commonwealth-Georgetown game took place at McDonough Gymnasium, Washington, DC.

=== 1979 tournaments ===
National rankings indicated.

==== Regional champions ====
Champions
Metro:: Iona
New England: Connecticut
South-Upstate: #16 Georgetown

==== Brackets ====
Sources
Metro

Semifinals, March 1, 1979; Nassau Coliseum, Uniondale, NY
Iona	80
Seton Hall	73
St. John's	86
Wagner	82

Final, March 3, 1979; Nassau Coliseum, Uniondale, NY
Iona	83
St. John's	57

New England

Semifinals, March 1, 1979; Providence Civic Center, Providence, RI
Connecticut	91
Boston College	74
Rhode Island	75
Holy Cross	71

Finals, March 3, 1979; Providence Civic Center, Providence, RI
Connecticut	58
Rhode Island	50

South-Upstate

Semifinals, February 28, 1979
#6 Syracuse	87
St. Bonaventure	71
#16 Georgetown	73
Old Dominion	52

Finals, March 3, 1979; Cole Field House, College Park, MD
#6 Syracuse	58
#16 Georgetown	66

Note: Syracuse-St. Bonaventure semifinal game was played at Rochester War Memorial, Rochester, NY. Georgetown-Old Dominion semifinal game was played in Cole Field House, College Park, MD.

=== 1980 tournaments ===
==== Regional champions ====
Champions
Metro:: Iona
South: Old Dominion

==== Brackets ====
Sources
Metro

Quarterfinals; February 28
Iona	69
Fairleigh Dickinson	53
Siena	80
Long Island University	78
Fordham	73
Wagner	67
Saint Peter's	54
Fairfield	42

Semifinals; February 29
Iona	76
Siena	70
Fordham	47
Saint Peter's	65

Championship; March 1
Iona	64
Saint Peter's	46

Notes

Conference did not play a formal schedule

South

Quarterfinals; Thursday, February 28
1	Old Dominion	112
8	Catholic	59
5	William & Mary	78
4	Richmond	77
3	Navy	51
6	Baltimore	50
7	St. Francis (PA)	58
2	James Madison	54

Semifinals; Friday, February 29
1	Old Dominion	75
5	William & Mary	59
3	Navy	75
7	St. Francis (PA)	62

Championship; Saturday, March 1
1	Old Dominion	62
3	Navy	51

=== 1981 tournaments ===
==== Regional champions ====
Champions
Metro:: Long Island-Brooklyn
South: James Madison

==== Brackets ====
Sources
Metro

Quarterfinals, March 2, 1981; Nassau Coliseum, Uniondale, NY
6	Iona	64
3	Siena	48
5	Long Island-Brooklyn	89
4	Wagner	78

Semifinals, March 5, 1981; Nassau Coliseum, Uniondale, NY
6	Iona	41
2	Saint Peter's	38
5	Long Island-Brooklyn	85
1	Fordham	78

Finals, March 7, 1981; Nassau Coliseum, Uniondale, NY
6	Iona	72
5	Long Island-Brooklyn	77

South

Quarterfinals, March 3, 1981; Hampton Coliseum, Hampton, VA
6	Robert Morris	50
3	William & Mary	73
5	Richmond	98
4	Saint Francis	78

Semifinals, March 5, 1981; Hampton Coliseum, Hampton, VA
3	William & Mary	42
2	James Madison	44
5	Richmond	79
1	Old Dominion	77

Finals, March 7, 1981; Hampton Coliseum, Hampton, VA
2	James Madison	69
5	Richmond	60

== Divisions II and III ==
=== Combined Division II/III tournaments ===
The ECAC organized combined Division II/Division III men's basketball tournaments annually from 1973 to 1980 as invitational events for ECAC teams not invited to the NCAA Division II men's basketball tournament or – after it began in 1975 – the NCAA Division III men's basketball tournament. From 1973 through 1975 and from 1977 through 1980, it held four regional tournaments – Metro (for the New York City area and New Jersey), New England, Southern (for schools south of New York and New Jersey), and Upstate (for Upstate New York) – each year, while in 1976 it held only three tournaments (Metro, New England, and Upstate).

After 1980, the ECAC divided the Division II and Division III competitions, placing the Division II competitions on hiatus until 1988 and beginning Division III-only tournaments in 1981.

Year	ECAC Division II/III regional champions
1973	Metro:: Brooklyn; New England: Tufts; Southern: East Stroudsburg; Upstate: Union
1974	Metro:: Trenton State; New England: Brandeis; Southern: Cheyney; Upstate: Brockport State
1975	Metro:: Bridgeport; New England: Quinnipiac; Southern: Bloomsburg; Upstate: Union
1976	Metro:: Upsala; New England: Amherst; Southern: No tournament Upstate: Hamilton
1977	Metro:: Kean; New England: Quinnipiac; Southern: Mansfield; Upstate: Potsdam State
1978	Metro:: Trenton State; New England: Quinnipiac; Southern: Loyola Maryland; Upstate: Albany
1979	Metro:: Monmouth; New England: Sacred Heart; Southern: East Stroudsburg; Upstate: Hamilton
1980	Metro:: Monmouth; New England: Saint Anselm; Southern: Mansfield; Upstate: Elmira

=== Division II tournaments ===
After 1980, the ECAC placed Division II end-of-season tournament competition on hiatus until 1988. From 1988 through 2005 it organized a single annual Division II men's basketball tournament as an invitational event for Division II ECAC teams not invited to that year's NCAA Division II men's basketball tournament. No tournament took place in 2006, but the ECAC held it twice more, in 2007 and 2008. The Division II tournament again went on hiatus from 2009 through 2013, thanks to various factors including an expansion of the NCAA Men's Division II Tournament field and a decline in the number of Division II men's basketball programs associated with the ECAC. A Division II tournament took place in 2014, but the tournament again went on hiatus after that.

Year	ECAC Division II Champions
1988	Dowling
1989	Merrimack
1990	Pace
1991	Pace
1992	Millersville
1993	Saint Rose
1994	Adelphi
1995	New York Tech
1996	Saint Michael's
1997	UMass Lowell
1998	Merrimack
1999	Merrimack
2000	Saint Michael's
2001	Saint Rose
2002	Southampton
2003	Mansfield
2004	Felician
2005	Bridgeport
2006	no tournament
2007	Goldey–Beacom
2008	Saint Vincent
2009–2013	no tournament
2014	Lincoln
2015–present	no tournament

=== Division III tournaments ===
After its last combined Division II/III regional tournaments in 1980, the ECAC split Division II and Division III tournament competition. In 1981, it held its first Division III-only postseason regional invitational men's basketball tournaments for ECAC teams not invited to the NCAA Division III men's basketball tournament, and these have occurred annually ever since. The ECAC organized these tournaments regionally, holding Metro (for the New York City area and New Jersey), New England, and Upstate (for Upstate New York) tournaments from 1981 to 1985 and adding a Southern tournament (for schools south of New York and New Jersey) in 1986. In 2013, the ECAC returned to a three-tournament structure, holding Metro, New England, and Southern regional tournaments, while in 2014 it had four tournaments (Metro, New England, Southeast, and Southwest). In 2015 and 2016, it again had a three-tournament structure, with New England, Metro, and South tournaments. In 2017, it changed format again, becoming a single tournament which determined a single ECAC Division III champion. No tournament took place in 2021 because of the COVID-19 pandemic, but the tournament resumed in 2022.

Year	ECAC Division III regional champions
1981	Metro: Jersey City State; New England: Massachusetts Maritime; Upstate: Hamilton
1982	Metro: New Jersey Tech; New England: Tufts; Upstate: Hamilton
1983	Metro: Jersey City State; New England: Rhode Island College; Upstate: Hamilton
1984	Metro: Moravian; New England: Trinity; Upstate: Hamilton
1985	Metro: New Jersey Tech; New England: Trinity; Upstate: Fredonia State
1986	Metro: Staten Island; New England: Trinity; Southern: Catholic; Upstate: Hamilton
1987	Metro: Old Westbury State; New England: Williams; Southern: Mary Washington; Upstate: Hamilton
1988	Metro: New Jersey Tech; New England: Saint Anselm; Southern: Frostburg State; Upstate: Geneseo State
1989	Metro: Kean; New England: Trinity; Southern: Ursinus; Upstate: Albany
1990	Metro: Stony Brook; New England: Colby; Southern: Allentown; Upstate: Hamilton
1991	Metro: Medgar Evers; New England: Colby; Southern: Lebanon Valley; Upstate: Potsdam State
1992	Metro: Glassboro State; New England: Brandeis; Southern: Dickinson; Upstate: Hamilton
1993	Metro: Jersey City State; New England: Colby; Southern: Lincoln; Upstate: Rochester Tech
1994	Metro: Jersey City State; New England: Western Connecticut State; Southern: Lincoln; Upstate: Elmira
1995	Metro: Kean; New England: Amherst; Southern: Alvernia; Upstate: Fredonia State
1996	Metro: Rutgers-Newark; New England: Amherst; Southern: Lincoln; Upstate: Oneonta State
1997	Metro: Drew; New England: Eastern Nazarene; Southern: Johns Hopkins; Upstate: Nazareth
1998	Metro: York (NY); New England: Colby–Sawyer; Southern: Lebanon Valley; Upstate: Plattsburgh State
1999	Metro: Fairleigh Dickinson-Madison; New England: Williams; Southern: Penn State-Behrend; Upstate: New Paltz State
2000	Metro: Montclair State; New England: Tufts; Southern: King's (Pa.); Upstate: Ithaca
2001	Metro: New Jersey City; New England: Williams; Southern: Lebanon Valley; Upstate: Geneseo State
2002	Metro: Ramapo; New England: Massachusetts-Dartmouth; Southern: Franklin & Marshall; Upstate: St. Lawrence
2003	Metro: Baruch; New England: Babson; Southern: Franklin & Marshall; Upstate: Rochester Tech
2004	Metro: Ramapo; New England: Western Connecticut State; Southern: Lebanon Valley; Upstate: Geneseo State
2005	Metro: Kean; New England: Wheaton (MA); Southern: Franklin & Marshall; Upstate: Oswego State
2006	Metro: New Jersey City; New England: Wheaton (MA); Southern: Albright; Upstate: Ithaca
2007	Metro: New York University; New England: Western New England; Southern: DeSales; Upstate: Vassar
2008	Metro: Stevens Tech; New England: Newbury; Southern: Carnegie Mellon; Upstate: Brockport State
2009	Metro: Lehman; New England: Becker; Southern: Washington & Jefferson; Upstate: Hartwick
2010	Metro: Baruch; New England: Elms; Southern: Penn State-Behrend; Upstate: Ithaca
2011	Metro: Stevens Tech; New England: Brandeis; Southern: Lebanon Valley; Upstate: Hobart
2012	Metro: Mount Saint Mary; New England: Worcester Tech; Southern: Alvernia; Upstate: Cortland State
2013	Metro: Old Westbury State; New England: Eastern Connecticut State; Southern: Juniata
2014	Metro: Staten Island; New England: Johnson & Wales; Southeast: Stevenson; Southwest: Juniata
2015	Metro: Staten Island; New England: Southern Vermont; South: Stevenson
2016	Metro: New Jersey City; New England: Nichols; South: Neumann
2017	Stockton
2018	Widener
2019	Brandeis
2020	Gwynedd Mercy
2021	No tournament
2022	Rutgers-Newark
2023	Alfred
2024	Juniata
2025	Virginia Wesleyan
2026	Keene State
