= John A. Lally Athletics Complex =

Syracuse University sports facility

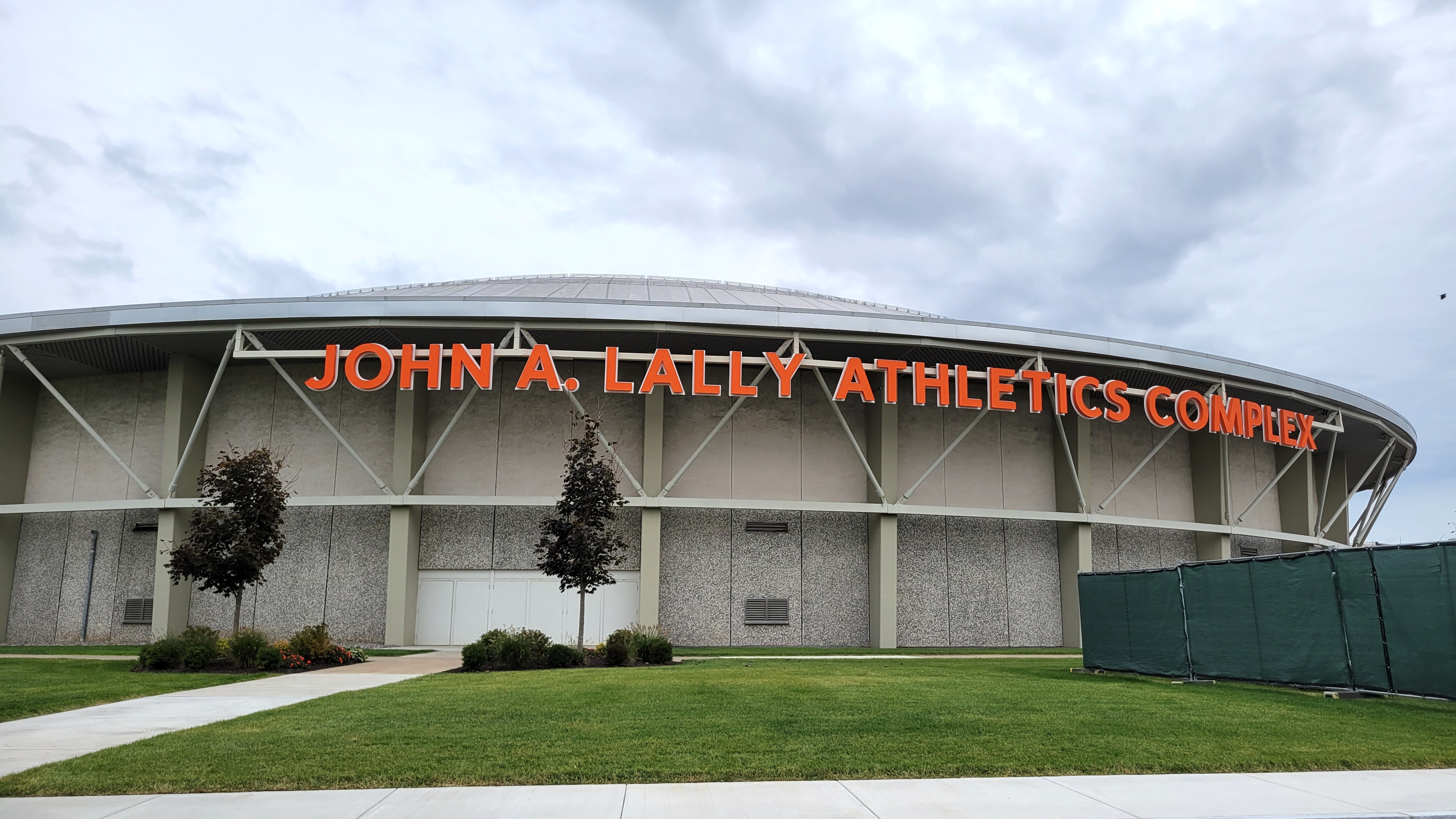
- Interactive map of John A. Lally Athletics Complex
- Former names: Manley Field House
- Address: 1301 E Colvin St; Syracuse, NY; U.S.
- Coordinates: 43°1′30″N 76°7′39″W
- Owner: Syracuse University
- Surface: Hard maple (basketball); Tartan turf (track); FieldTurf

Construction
- Opened: 1962; 64 years ago

Tenant
- Syracuse Orange

The John A. Lally Athletics Complex, formerly known as Manley Field House, is a multi-purpose academic and athletics village at Syracuse University in Syracuse, New York. Located at the university's South Campus, it is home to 20 Syracuse Orange athletics teams and serves as a hub for over 600 student-athletes. Following announcement of a $150 million expansion plan, it was renamed the John A. Lally Athletics Complex in 2021.

== History ==
=== 1960s ===
Named after Dr. George L. Manley, a university trustee and graduate of the now defunct College of Medicine, Manley Field House was built to replace the old Archbold Gymnasium. The $2 million building was dedicated on December 15, 1962, by Chancellor William Tolley.

While the facility was used primarily as a basketball facility, it was originally intended to be an indoor football practice facility. It was home to the Syracuse Orange men's and women's basketball teams, the indoor track team, and the women's volleyball team before the Carrier Dome opened in 1980. At one time it held 9,500 people for home games. Van Halen performed a sold out concert at the building on May 17, 1979.

=== 1980s and the opening of Carrier Dome ===
After 1980 season, Syracuse basketball started playing their games in the newly constructed Carrier Dome, now known as JMA Wireless Dome, and Manley field house was relegated to a secondary stadium status. On February 13, 1980, the Georgetown Hoyas men's basketball team defeated No. 2 Syracuse 52–50 in the final game played in Manley. After the victory, Georgetown head coach John Thompson Jr. said that "Manley Field House is officially closed". With basketball out of Manley Field House, the arena was converted into an indoor practice facility for football and men's and women's lacrosse.

=== 1990s ===
In the 1990s, Syracuse University developed a new football wing on Manley. The football facility was a large complex with a Hall of Fame Gallery at its center. The facility was designed by architect Lawrence C. Apgar, a Syracuse alumnus.

Due to the climate of Syracuse, the university had lost a recruiting edge to other schools with newer football facilities. The field house was retrofitted with FieldTurf and provided practice space for outdoor teams, which usually fight for space (usually only half of a field) in the Carrier Dome in late winter/early spring when the basketball court is still set up. Full glass windows were installed and seating was removed, creating room for nearly a full-sized football field.

=== 2000s ===
On September 26, 2007, ground was broken for the new Carmelo K. Anthony Basketball Center, which houses practice courts, weight rooms, locker rooms and offices for both the men's and women's basketball teams. This freed up Manley Field House, which was the practice facility for the teams. For the 2007–2008 season, the women's basketball team played all of its home games in the Carrier Dome for the first time.

On January 27, 2008, a temporary AstroTurf-like "carpet" was installed to provide practice space for the outdoor teams until the permanent installation took place.

=== Recent developments ===
In 2015, nearby Ensley Athletic Center took over as the primary football practice facility.

In November 2021, Syracuse University announced a $150 million initiative to renovate and expand Manley Field House. The complex was renamed the John A. Lally Athletics Complex following a $25 million donation by former Syracuse offensive lineman and alumnus John A. Lally and his wife Laura. The first phase of the multi-million dollar, years-long project began in the spring of 2022.

== Facilities ==
The complex houses an indoor FieldTurf practice area, a three-lane running track, as well as athletics and administrative offices, academic support offices, study facilities, lockerrooms, the sports medicine complex, and the Stevenson Educational Center.

== Tournaments hosted ==
Manley Field House hosted the ECAC Upstate Region tournament organized by the Eastern College Athletic Conference (ECAC) in 1976 as well as a semifinal game of the 1977 ECAC South Region tournament.
