= 1978–79 St. John's Redmen basketball team =

American college basketball season

1978–79 St. John's Redmen men's basketball

Lapchick Memorial Champions

1979 NCAA tournament, Elite Eight
- Conference: Independent

Ranking
- AP: No. 17
- Record: 21–11
- Head coach: Lou Carnesecca (11th season)
- Assistant coaches: John Kresse (11th season); Tom Abatemarco (1st season); Ron Rutledge (1st season)
- Captain: Tom Calabrese
- Home arena: Alumni Hall; Madison Square Garden

The 1978–79 St. John's Redmen basketball team represented St. John's University during the 1978–79 NCAA Division I men's basketball season. The team was coached by Lou Carnesecca in his eleventh year at the school. St. John's home games were (and to this day still are) played at Alumni Hall and Madison Square Garden.

== Roster ==
1978–79 St. John's Red Storm men's basketball team
Players
Coaches

Pos.	#	Name	Height	Weight	Year	Previous school	Hometown
F	-	Ray James	6 ft 7 in (2.01 m)	—	Fr	Alexander Hamilton	Brooklyn, NY
G	-	Ed Kennedy	5 ft 9 in (1.75 m)	—	Jr	Maria Regina	Merrick, NY
G/F	-	Curtis Redding (redshirt)	6 ft 5 in (1.96 m)	—	Jr	Canarsie/Kansas State	Brooklyn, NY
G	4	Tom Calabrese (C)	6 ft 0 in (1.83 m)	—	Sr	Cliffside Park	Cliffside Park, NJ
G	5	Bernard Rencher	6 ft 1 in (1.85 m)	—	RS Jr	Mater Christi/Notre Dame	Elmhurst, NY
G/F	22	Ron Plair	6 ft 4 in (1.93 m)	—	So	William C. Bryant	East Elmhurst, NY
G/F	32	Gordon Thomas	6 ft 4 in (1.93 m)	—	Sr	Bay Shore	Bay Shore, NY
G	35	Reggie Carter	6 ft 3 in (1.91 m)	—	RS Jr	Long Island Lutheran/Hawaii	New York, NY
F/C	-	Rick Bollinger	6 ft 7 in (2.01 m)	—	Sr	River Dell	Teaneck, NJ
F	43	Frank Gilroy	6 ft 6 in (1.98 m)	—	So	Holy Cross	Whitestone, NY
F	44	Rudy Wright	6 ft 7 in (2.01 m)	—	Sr	Long Island City	Queens, NY
G/F	-	Tim Cluess	6 ft 6 in (1.98 m)	—	Fr	St. Agnes	West Hempstead, NY
C	55	Wayne McKoy	6 ft 9 in (2.06 m)	—	So	Long Island Lutheran	Bayside, NY

Head coach

- Lou Carnesecca (St. John's, 11th)

Assistant coach(es)

- John Kresse (St. John's, 11th)
- Tom Abatemarco (Dowling, 1st)
- Ron Rutledge (St. John's, 1st)

Legend

- (C) Team captain
- (S) Suspended
- (I) Ineligible
- (W) Walk-on
- Injured
- Current redshirt

== Schedule and results ==
Date time, TV	Rank^{#}	Opponent^{#}	Result	Record	Site city, state
Regular season
11/24/78*		American; Lapchick Tournament Opening Round	W 72-70	1-0	Alumni Hall; Queens, NY
11/25/78*		Wagner; Lapchick tournament championship	W 108-91	2-0	Alumni Hall; Queens, NY
11/28/78*		Wisconsin	L 68-73	2-1	Alumni Hall; Queens, NY
12/02/78*		Princeton	W 71-51	3-1	Alumni Hall; Queens, NY
12/07/78*		Baylor	W 83-82	4-1	Alumni Hall; Queens, NY
12/09/78*		No. 20 Georgetown	L 71-77	4-2	Alumni Hall; Queens, NY
12/12/78*		at Columbia	L 77-90	4-3	Levien Gymnasium; New York, NY
12/16/78*		BYU	W 90-83	5-3	Alumni Hall; Queens, NY
12/22/78*		Tennessee Tech	W 100-56	6-3	Alumni Hall; Queens, NY
12/29/78*		vs. Rutgers; ECAC Holiday Festival Semifinal	L 61-72	6-4	Madison Square Garden; New York, NY
12/30/78*		vs. No. 1 Duke; ECAC Holiday Festival Consolation	W 69-66	7-4	Madison Square Garden; New York, NY
01/04/79*		at Seton Hall	L 70-76	7-5	Walsh Gymnasium; South Orange, NJ
01/06/79*		Temple	L 73-74	7-6	Alumni Hall; Queens, NY
01/09/79*		Baltimore	W 75-52	8-6	Alumni Hall; Queens, NY
01/13/79*		Rutgers	L 66-69	8-7	Alumni Hall; Queens, NY
01/16/79*		at Villanova	W 74-54	9-7	The Palestra; Philadelphia, PA
01/20/79*		Rhode Island	L 70-71	9-8	Alumni Hall; Queens, NY
01/23/79*		at Manhattan	W 80-55	10-8	Alumni Gym; Bronx, NY
01/28/79*		at Saint Joseph's	W 47-40	11-8	The Palestra; Philadelphia, PA
01/31/79*		at Army	W 72-65	12-8	USMA Fieldhouse; West Point, NY
02/03/79*		Niagara	W 80-52	13-8	Alumni Hall; Queens, NY
02/06/79*		Boston College	W 85-76	14-8	Alumni Hall; Queens, NY
02/10/79*		at Fordham	W 66-48	15-8	Rose Hill Gymnasium; Bronx, NY
02/13/79*		Holy Cross	W 82-66	16-8	Alumni Hall; Queens, NY
02/17/79*		at No. 7 Syracuse	L 72-79	16-9	Manley Field House; Syracuse, NY
02/24/79*		Providence	W 70-65	17-9	Alumni Hall; Queens, NY
ECAC Metro tournament
03/01/79		vs. Wagner; ECAC Metro Semifinal	W 86-82 ^{OT}	18-9	Nassau Coliseum; Uniondale, NY
03/03/79		vs. Iona; ECAC Metro Final	L 57-63	18-10	Nassau Coliseum; Uniondale, NY
NCAA tournament
03/09/79*	No. 17	vs. No. 13 (7) Temple; NCAA First Round	W 75-70	19-10	Reynolds Coliseum; Raleigh, NC
03/11/79*	No. 17	vs. No. 6 (2) Duke; NCAA Second Round	W 80-78	20-10	Reynolds Coliseum; Raleigh, NC
03/16/79*	No. 17	vs. No. 18 (6) Rutgers; NCAA Sweet Sixteen	W 67-65	21-10	Greensboro Coliseum; Greensboro, NC
03/18/79*	No. 17	vs. No. 14 (9) Penn; NCAA Elite Eight	L 62-64	21-11	Greensboro Coliseum; Greensboro, NC
*Non-conference game. ^{#}Rankings from AP Poll. (#) Tournament seedings in parentheses.

== Team players drafted into the NBA ==
Round	Pick	Player	NBA club	Ref.
2	27	Reggie Carter	New York Knicks	
10	189	Gordon Thomas	New York Knicks	
