= 1978–79 Boston College Eagles men's basketball team =

American college basketball season

1978–79 Boston College Eagles men's basketball
- Conference: Independent
- Record: 22–9
- Head coach: Tom Davis (2nd season)
- Home arena: Roberts Center

The 1978–79 Boston College Eagles men's basketball team represented Boston College during the 1978–79 NCAA men's basketball season.

In 1981, forward Rick Kuhn was convicted of conspiracy in a point-shaving scheme in which he, guard Jim Sweeney, and forward Ernie Cobb attempted to manipulate the scores of some games on behalf of organized crime. Kuhn was sentenced to 10 years in prison, though it was later reduced to 28 months in prison. Sweeney testified that he acted under duress, and was not charged. Ernie Cobb would also not be charged for his involvement in the case. Decades later, Cobb's name would be edited out and replaced with former Boston College player Joe Streater (who did not play for Boston College during this season or subsequent seasons after this one, but played in the season prior to this one) in the Wikipedia article on the point-shaving scandal, which would cause accidental misinformation for five years on places like Bleacher Report, ESPN, and Yahoo News claiming that Streater was a point shaver instead of Cobb.

== Roster ==
1978–79 Boston College Eagles men's basketball team
Players
Coaches

Pos.	#	Name	Height	Weight	Year	Hometown
C		Joe Beaulieu	—	—
G		Mike Bennett	—	—
F		Michael Bowie	—	—
F		Vin Caraher	—	—
G		Dwan Chandler	—	—
G		Tim Chase	—	—
G	14	Ernie Cobb	—	—
C		Ron Crevier	—	—
G/F		Chris Foy	—	—
G		Chris Jantzen	—	—
F	35	Rick Kuhn	—	—
C		Tom Meggers	—	—
F		Rich Shrigley	—	—
G	11	Jim Sweeney	—	—

Head coach

- Tom Davis

Assistant coach(es)

- Kevin Mackey

Legend

- (C) Team captain
- (S) Suspended
- (I) Ineligible
- (W) Walk-on
- Injured
- Current redshirt

Roster
Last update: 2016-Feb-10

== See also ==
- 1978–79 Boston College basketball point shaving scandal
