= Robert Morris Colonials men's basketball =

Basketball team that represents Robert Morris University

2026–27 Robert Morris Colonials men's basketball team
- University: Robert Morris University
- Head coach: Andrew Toole (17th season)
- Location: Moon Township, Pennsylvania
- Arena: UPMC Events Center (capacity: 4,000)
- Conference: Horizon League
- Nickname: Colonials
- Colors: Blue, white, and red

NCAA Division I tournament appearances
- 1982, 1983, 1989, 1990, 1992, 2009, 2010, 2015, 2025

Conference tournament champions
- NEC: 1982, 1983, 1989, 1990, 1992, 2009, 2010, 2015, 2020; Horizon: 2025

Conference regular-season champions
- NEC: 1982, 1983, 1984, 1989, 1990, 1992, 2008, 2009, 2010, 2013, 2014; Horizon: 2025

Uniforms
Home	Away

The Robert Morris Colonials men's basketball team is the basketball team that represents Robert Morris University in Moon Township, Pennsylvania, United States. The school's team currently competes in the Horizon League. The Colonials current head coach is Andrew Toole who is in his fifteenth season at RMU. Toole was hired when, after three years in charge and 73 wins, head coach Mike Rice Jr. left the program in 2010 to take the head coaching job at Rutgers.

Robert Morris has appeared nine times in the NCAA Division I men's basketball tournament, most recently in 2025. The Colonials picked up their first ever tournament win in the Preliminary Round of the 1983 NCAA Tournament over Georgia Southern, and at the 2015 NCAA tournament, the Colonials beat North Florida in the First Four for their second win before losing to No. 1-seeded Duke (the eventual national champion) in the First Round.

Five years earlier, in the 2010 NCAA tournament, the 15-seed Colonials nearly upset 2-seed Villanova in the First Round before losing in overtime. The team is also known for its upset over No. 1-seeded (and 2012 national champion) Kentucky at the buzzer in the opening round of the 2013 National Invitation Tournament and another upset over traditional Big East powerhouse St. John's in the opening round of the 2014 NIT. However, in both cases, the Colonials lost in the second round. Top supporters of the RMU basketball program include Jordan "Twash" Tuschak and Jeffrey Broadhurst, CEO of Eat'n Park Hospitality Group.

== Postseason results ==
=== NCAA tournament results ===
The Colonials have appeared in the NCAA tournament nine times. Their record is 2–9. They have also qualified for the 2020 NCAA tournament, which was cancelled amid the COVID-19 pandemic.

Year	Seed	Round	Opponent	Result
1982	#12	First Round	#5 Indiana	L 62–94
1983	#12	Preliminary Round; First Round	#12 Georgia Southern #5 Purdue	W 64–54; L 53–55
1989	#16	First Round	#1 Arizona	L 60–94
1990	#15	First Round	#2 Kansas	L 71–79
1992	#16	First Round	#1 UCLA	L 53–73
2009	#15	First Round	#2 Michigan State	L 62–77
2010	#15	First Round	#2 Villanova	L 70–73 ^{OT}
2015	#16	First Four; First Round	#16 North Florida #1 Duke	W 81–77; L 56–85
2025	#15	First Round	#2 Alabama	L 81–90

=== NIT results ===
The Colonials have appeared in three National Invitation Tournaments (NIT). Their record is 2–3.

Year	Round	Opponent	Result
2008	First Round	Syracuse	L 81–87
2013	First Round; Second Round	Kentucky; Providence	W 59–57; L 68–77
2014	First Round; Second Round	St. John's; Belmont	W 89–78; L 71–82

=== CIT results ===
The Colonials have appeared in two CollegeInsider.com Postseason Tournaments (CIT). Their record is 3–2.

Year	Round	Opponent	Result
2012	First Round; Second Round; Quarterfinals	Indiana State; Toledo; Fairfield	W 67–60; W 69–51; L 61–67
2019	First Round; Second Round	Cornell; Presbyterian	W 98–89^{OT} L 70–77

== Home court ==
On January 30, 2017, Robert Morris announced plans to build a new basketball and volleyball facility named the UPMC Events Center on the school's campus. The basketball team's former home, the Charles L. Sewall Center was to be demolished to make room for the new arena. The 2017–18 Colonials played their home games at the PPG Paints Arena and at the Palumbo Center on the campus of Duquesne University. The 2018–19 Colonials played their home games at the North Athletic Complex on campus. The UPMC Events Center opened in May 2019.
