= Jacksonville Dolphins men's basketball statistical leaders =

The Jacksonville Dolphins men's basketball statistical leaders are individual statistical leaders of the Jacksonville Dolphins men's basketball program in various categories, including points, rebounds, assists, steals, and blocks. Within those areas, the lists identify single-game, single-season, and career leaders. The Dolphins represent Jacksonville University in the NCAA Division I ASUN Conference.

Jacksonville began competing in intercollegiate basketball in 1948. However, the school's record book does not generally list records from before the 1950s, as records from before this period are often incomplete and inconsistent. Since scoring was much lower in this era, and teams played much fewer games during a typical season, it is likely that few or no players from this era would appear on these lists anyway.

The NCAA did not officially record assists as a stat until the 1983–84 season, and blocks and steals until the 1985–86 season, but Jacksonville's record books includes players in these stats before these seasons. These lists are updated through the end of the 2020–21 season.

== Scoring ==
Career
Rank	Player	Points	Seasons
1	Ralph Tiner	2,184	1961–62 1962–63 1963–64 1964–65
2	Ben Smith	1,971	2006–07 2007–08 2008–09 2009–10
3	Ronnie Murphy	1,937	1983–84 1984–85 1985–86 1986–87
4	Artemus McClary	1,789	1992–93 1993–94 1994–95 1995–96
5	Otis Smith	1,715	1982–83 1983–84 1984–85 1985–86
6	Roger Strickland	1,691	1960–61 1961–62 1962–63
7	Dick Pruet	1,648	1963–64 1964–65 1965–66 1966–67
8	James Ray	1,591	1976–77 1977–78 1978–79 1979–80
9	Jim Kirkland	1,574	1957–58 1958–59 1959–60 1960–61
10	Reggie Law	1,531	1987–88 1988–89 1989–90 1990–91

Season
Rank	Player	Points	Season
1	Roger Strickland	783	1961–62
2	Artis Gilmore	742	1969–70
3	Ernie Fleming	682	1971–72
4	Ronnie Murphy	661	1986–87
5	Ralph Tiner	656	1963–64
6	Ben Smith	652	2009–10
7	Roger Strickland	638	1962–63
8	Leon Benbow	618	1973–74
9	Rex Morgan	613	1968–69
10	Kori Babineaux	594	2015–16

Single game
Rank	Player	Points	Season	Opponent
1	Ernie Fleming	59	1971–72	St. Peter’s
2	Dick Pruet	54	1965–66	MacMurray
3	Roger Strickland	52	1961–62	Georgia Southern
4	Roger Strickland	50	1961–62	Tampa
	Artis Gilmore	50	1970–71	St. Thomas (Fl)
6	Roger Strickland	47	1961–62	Miami (Fl)
7	Roger Strickland	46	1961–62	Rollins
	Artis Gilmore	46	1969–70	St. Peter’s
9	James Ray	45	1979–80	South Florida
10	Rex Morgan	43	1968–69	Fairleigh Dickinson

== Rebounds ==
Career
Rank	Player	Rebounds	Seasons
1	Artis Gilmore	1,224	1969–70 1970–71
2	Dick Pruet	950	1963–64 1964–65 1965–66 1966–67
3	Gene Martineau	939	1963–64 1964–65 1965–66 1966–67
4	Otis Smith	911	1982–83 1983–84 1984–85 1985–86
5	Artemus McClary	883	1992–93 1993–94 1994–95 1995–96
6	Mike Hackett	862	1978–79 1979–80 1980–81 1981–82
7	Marcus Allen	808	2005–06 2006–07 2007–08 2008–09
8	James Ray	793	1976–77 1977–78 1978–79 1979–80
9	Jim Kirkland	747	1957–58 1958–59 1959–60 1960–61

Season
Rank	Player	Rebounds	Season
1	Artis Gilmore	621	1969–70
2	Artis Gilmore	603	1970–71
3	Tim Burroughs	370	1991–92
4	Butch Taylor	364	1973–74
5	Tim Burroughs	350	1990–91
6	Butch Taylor	327	1972–73
7	Abe Steward	314	1971–72
8	David Bell	310	2019–20
9	Mike Hackett	304	1981–82
10	Rod McIntyre	283	1967–68

Single game
Rank	Player	Rebounds	Season	Opponent
1	Artis Gilmore	34	1970–71	St. Peter’s
2	Artis Gilmore	32	1969–70	Mercer
3	Artis Gilmore	30	1969–70	St. Thomas (Fl)
	Artis Gilmore	30	1969–70	St. Peter’s
5	Artis Gilmore	29	1969–70	Richmond
	Artis Gilmore	29	1970–71	St. Thomas (Fl)
	Artis Gilmore	29	1970–71	George Washington
8	Artis Gilmore	28	1969–70	Hawaii
	Artis Gilmore	28	1970–71	Florida State
	Artis Gilmore	28	1970–71	Loyola (La.)
	Artis Gilmore	28	1970–71	East Carolina

== Assists ==
Career
Rank	Player	Assists	Seasons
1	Ben Smith	515	2006–07 2007–08 2008–09 2009–10
2	Jeremy Livingston	507	1991–92 1992–93 1993–94 1994–95
3	Kevin Sheppard	427	1998–99 1999–00 2000–01 2001–02 2002–03
4	Ronnie Murphy	407	1983–84 1984–85 1985–86 1986–87
5	Russell Powell	384	2009–10 2010–11 2011–12 2012–13
6	Cricket Williams	380	1975–76 1976–77 1977–78 1978–79
7	Rex Morgan	359	1968–69 1969–70
8	Vaughn Wedeking	356	1968–69 1969–70 1970–71
9	Harold Fox	349	1970–71 1971–72
10	Maurice Roulhac	336	1979–80 1980–81 1981–82 1982–83

Season
Rank	Player	Assists	Season
1	Danny Tirado	259	1990–91
2	Rex Morgan	251	1969–70
3	Harold Fox	196	1971–72
4	Aubrey Conerly	161	2005–06
5	Devin Harris	158	2017–18
6	Harold Fox	153	1970–71
7	Dee Brown	151	1989–90
8	Ronnie Murphy	150	1985–86
9	Pat Laguerre	147	1988–89
10	Jeremy Livingston	144	1991–92

Single game
Rank	Player	Assists	Season	Opponent
1	Roger Strickland	20	1962–63	Rollins
2	Danny Tirado	17	1990–91	South Alabama
3	Danny Tirado	16	1990–91	Western Kentucky
	Devin Harris	16	2017–18	North Florida
5	Roger Strickland	15	1962–63	N.H.
	Harold Fox	15	1970–71	George Washington
	Danny Tirado	15	1990–91	Maryland
8	Harold Fox	14	1971–72	Houston
	Ricky Coleman	14	1974–75	Georgia Southern
	Danny Tirado	14	1990–91	Navy
	Danny Tirado	14	1990–91	Western Kentucky
	Danny Tirado	14	1990–91	UNCC
	Jeremy Livingston	14	1992–93	Lamar

== Steals ==
Career
Rank	Player	Steals	Seasons
1	Ben Smith	230	2006–07 2007–08 2008–09 2009–10
2	Ayron Hardy	218	2007–08 2008–09 2009–10 2010–11
3	Jeremy Livingston	208	1991–92 1992–93 1993–94 1994–95
4	Ronnie Murphy	205	1983–84 1984–85 1985–86 1986–87
5	Dee Brown	201	1986–87 1987–88 1988–89 1989–90
6	Artemus McClary	192	1992–93 1993–94 1994–95 1995–96
7	Otis Smith	189	1982–83 1983–84 1984–85 1985–86
8	Kevin Sheppard	147	1998–99 1999–00 2000–01 2001–02 2002–03
9	James Daniels	138	1999–00 2000–01 2001–02 2002–03
10	Darien Fernandez	133	2015–16 2016–17

Season
Rank	Player	Steals	Season
1	Dee Brown	88	1989–90
2	Darien Fernandez	79	2016–17
3	Danny Tirado	76	1990–91
4	Ronnie Murphy	70	1986–87
	Ben Smith	70	2008–09
6	Ben Smith	66	2009–10
	Ayron Hardy	66	2009–10
8	Artemus McClary	62	1995–96
9	Ronnie Murphy	60	1985–86
	Otis Smith	60	1985–86

Single game
Rank	Player	Steals	Season	Opponent
1	Ronnie Murphy	9	1986–87	South Florida
2	Toby Frazier	8	2000–01	Coastal Carolina
	Shawn Platts	8	2000–01	Samford
4	Artemus McClary	7	1992–93	Florida State
	Jesse Kimbrough	7	2006–07	Savannah St.
	Ayron Hardy	7	2009–10	ETSU
	Darien Fernandez	7	2016–17	Kennesaw State
	Marcus Niblack	7	2023–24	UL Monroe

== Blocks ==
Career
Rank	Player	Blocks	Seasons
1	Artis Gilmore	269	1969–70 1970–71
2	Otis Smith	211	1982–83 1983–84 1984–85 1985–86
3	Haminn Quaintance	150	2003–04 2004–05
4	James Ray	132	1976–77 1977–78 1978–79 1979–80
5	Willie McDuffie	127	1984–85 1985–86 1986–87 1989–90
6	Ryan Lewis	122	2001–02 2002–03
7	Ayron Hardy	118	2007–08 2008–09 2009–10 2010–11
	Steve Gilbert	118	1987–88 1988–89 1989–90
9	Micah Ross	117	1994–95 1995–96 1996–97 1997–98
10	Kris Hunter	114	2000–01

Season
Rank	Player	Blocks	Season
1	Artis Gilmore	269	1970–71
2	Kris Hunter	114	2000–01
3	Haminn Quaintance	84	2003–04
4	Otis Smith	75	1984–85
5	Otis Smith	72	1985–86
6	Ryan Lewis	66	2002–03
	Haminn Quaintance	66	2004–05
8	David Bell	61	2019–20
9	Steve Gilbert	57	1988–89
10	Ryan Lewis	56	2001–02
	Jalyn Hinton	56	2018–19

Single game
Rank	Player	Blocks	Season	Opponent
1	Artis Gilmore	14	1970–71	Miami (Fl)
2	Artis Gilmore	13	1970–71	East Carolina
3	Artis Gilmore	12	1970–71	Florida St.
4	Artis Gilmore	11	1970–71	Loyola (La.)
	Artis Gilmore	11	1970–71	William & Mary
	Artis Gilmore	11	1970–71	Western Ky.
7	Artis Gilmore	10	1970–71	Valdosta St.
	Artis Gilmore	10	1970–71	Houston
9	Artis Gilmore	9	1970–71	Oklahoma City
	Steve Gilbert	9	1989–90	VCU
	Ryan Lewis	9	2001–02	Sav. St.
	Haminn Quaintance	9	2003–04	Sav. St.
