= List of Virginia Tech Hokies in the NFL draft =

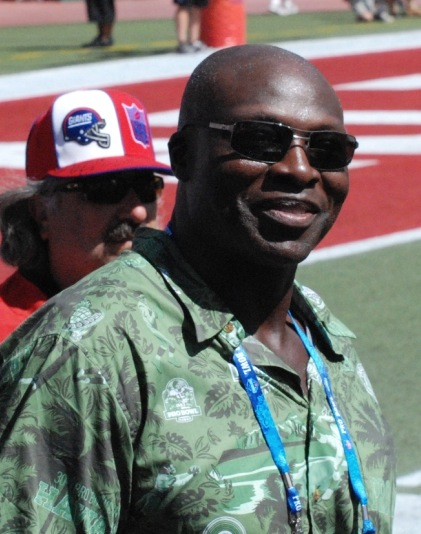
Bruce Smith was the first overall selection in the 1985 NFL draft.

The Virginia Tech Hokies football team has had 151 players drafted into the National Football League (NFL) since the league began holding drafts in 1936. (Note: Because of the NFL–AFL merger agreement, the history of the AFL is officially recognized by the NFL and therefore this list includes the AFL draft (1960–1966) and the common draft (1967–1969).) This includes eleven players taken in the first round and two overall number one picks, Bruce Smith in the 1985 NFL draft and Michael Vick in the 2001 NFL draft. Fifteen former Virginia Tech players have been selected to a Pro Bowl, thirteen have won a championship with their respective teams and one has been elected to the Pro Football Hall of Fame.

Each NFL franchise seeks to add new players through the annual NFL draft. The draft rules were last updated in 2009. The team with the worst record the previous year picks first, the next-worst team second, and so on. Teams that did not make the playoffs are ordered by their regular-season record with any remaining ties broken by strength of schedule. Playoff participants are sequenced after non-playoff teams, based on their round of elimination (wild card, division, conference, and Super Bowl). Prior to the merger agreements in 1966, the American Football League (AFL) operated in direct competition with the NFL and held a separate draft. This led to a bidding war over top prospects between the two leagues. As part of the merger agreement on June 8, 1966, the two leagues held a multiple round "common draft". Once the AFL officially merged with the NFL in 1970, the "common draft" became the NFL draft.

== Key ==
B	Back	K	Kicker	NT	Nose tackle
C	Center	LB	Linebacker	FB	Fullback
DB	Defensive back	P	Punter	HB	Halfback
DE	Defensive end	QB	Quarterback	WR	Wide receiver
DT	Defensive tackle	RB	Running back	G	Guard
E	End	T	Offensive tackle	TE	Tight end

^{*}	Selected to an all-star game (AFL All-Star game, NFL All-Star game or Pro Bowl)
^{†}	Won a league championship (AFL championship, NFL championship, or Super Bowl)
^{‡}	Inducted into Pro Football Hall of Fame

== Selections ==
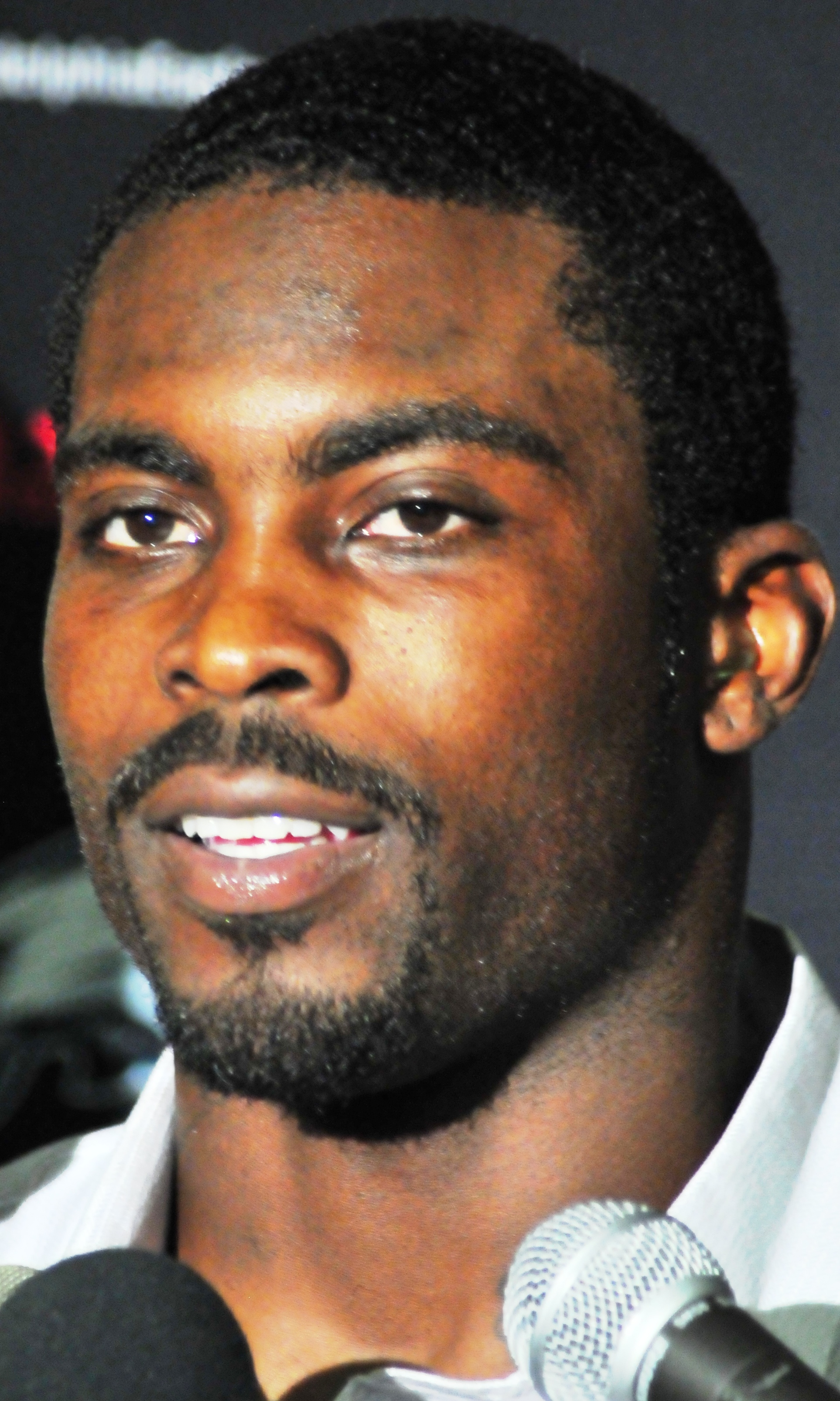
Michael Vick was the first overall selection in the 2001 NFL draft.

=== American Football League ===
Year	Round	Overall	Player name	Position	AFL team	Notes
1960	1		Carroll Dale	E	Oakland Raiders	—
1961	4	26	Mike Zeno	G	Boston Patriots	—
1961	21	162	Don Oakes*	T	Boston Patriots	AFL All-Star Game (1967)
1962	No selections					
1963	16	122	Gene Breen	LB	San Diego Chargers	—
1964	12	93	Jake Adams	E	Kansas City Chiefs	—
1965	4	28	Bob Schweickert	B	New York Jets	—
1965	13	100	Sonny Utz	FB	New York Jets	—
1966	No selections					

=== National Football League ===
Year	Round	Pick	Overall	Player name	Position	NFL team	Notes
1936	No selections						
1937	7	3	63	Herman "Foots" Dickerson	E	Chicago Cardinals	—
1938	No selections						
1939	No selections						
1940	No selections						
1941	No selections						
1942	No selections						
1943	No selections						
1944	14	11	142	John Maskas (Note: John Maskas was also drafted by the Buffalo Bills of the All-America Football Conference (AAFC) in the 10th round with the 74th overall pick of the 1947 AAFC draft. He played for the Bills in 1947 and 1949, and was then drafted by the San Francisco 49ers in the seventh round of the 1950 AAFC dispersal draft.)	G/T	Boston Yanks	—
1945	No selections						
1946	No selections						
1947	No selections						
1948	No selections						
1949	No selections						
1950	No selections						
1951	28	10	337	Sterling Wingo	B	Los Angeles Rams	—
1952	No selections						
1953	12	3	136	Madison "Buzz" Nutter*†	C	Washington Redskins	Pro Bowl (1963); NFL Champion (1958, 1959)
1954	25	11	300	Tom Hughes	T	Cleveland Browns	—
1955	5	2	51	George Preas†	G/T	Baltimore Colts	NFL Champion (1958, 1959)
1955	7	9	82	Johnny Dean	B	San Francisco 49ers	—
1955	21	1	242	Howie Wright	B	Chicago Cardinals	—
1955	27	2	315	Jim Locke	T	Baltimore Colts	—
1955	30	2	351	Tom Petty	E	Washington Redskins	—
1956	No selections						
1957	13	2	147	Bob Wolfenden	B	Los Angeles Rams	—
1957	16	10	191	Hillmer Olson	C	Detroit Lions	—
1957	22	11	264	Tom Dalzell	T	Chicago Bears	—
1958	24	4	281	Russ Moon	T	Chicago Bears	—
1959	26	2	302	Jim Burks	T	Philadelphia Eagles	—
1960	8	2	26	Carroll Dale*†	E	Los Angeles Rams	Pro Bowl (1968, 1969, 1970); NFL Champion (1965); Super Bowl Champion (I, II); College Football Hall of Fame (1987)
1961	3	14	42	Don Oakes*†	T	Philadelphia Eagles	AFL All-Star (1967)
1961	16	4	214	Mike Zeno	G	Los Angeles Rams	—
1961	16	11	221	Bernie Vishneski	T	New York Giants	—
1962	No selections						
1963	15	14	210	Gene Breen	LB	Green Bay Packers	—
1964	13	9	177	Jake Adams	E	St. Louis Cardinals	—
1965	3	1	29	Bob Schweickert	B	San Francisco 49ers	—
1965	6	5	75	Sonny Utz	FB	Dallas Cowboys	—
1966	No selections						
1967	4	25	105	Andy Bowling	LB	St. Louis Cardinals	—
1967	14	6	347	Tom Francisco	HB	Denver Broncos	—
1967	16	16	409	Don Bruce	G	Oakland Raiders	—
1968	5	2	113	Ken Barefoot	TE	Washington Redskins	—
1968	8	18	210	Jim Richards	DB	New York Jets	—
1969	8	1	183	James "Waddey" Harvey	T	Buffalo Bills	—
1969	13	24	335	Rick Piland	G	Kansas City Chiefs	—
1970	6	4	134	Ken Edwards	RB	Buffalo Bills	—
1971	17	9	425	Jack Simcsak	Placekicker	Denver Broncos	—
1972	No selections						
1973	5	7	111	Don Strock†	QB	Miami Dolphins	Super Bowl Champion (VIII)
1974	No selections						
1975	13	15	327	Ricky Scales	WR	Houston Oilers	—
1975	16	12	402	Ken Lambert	DB	Houston Oilers	—
1976	7	21	203	Phil Rogers	RB	St. Louis Cardinals	—
1977	3	4	60	Tom Beasley†	DT	Pittsburgh Steelers	Super Bowl Champion (XIII, XIV)
1978	No selections						
1979	No selections						
1980	5	14	124	Doug McDougald	DE	New England Patriots	—
1980	5	15	125	Kenny Lewis	RB	Oakland Raiders	—
1981	No selections						
1982	4	15	98	Robert Brown	LB	Green Bay Packers	—
1983	No selections						
1984	6	9	149	Tony Paige	FB	New York Jets	—
1984	1 (Note: Mike Johnson was selected as the 18th overall pick in the 1984 NFL supplemental draft of USFL and CFL players.)	18	18	Mike Johnson*†	LB	Cleveland Browns	Pro Bowl (1989, 1990)
1985	1	1	1	Bruce Smith*‡	DE	Buffalo Bills	Pro Bowl (1987, 1988, 1989, 1990, 1992, 1993, 1994, 1995, 1996, 1997, 1998); Pro Football Hall of Fame (2009)
1985	2	16	44	Jesse Penn	LB	Dallas Cowboys	—
1985	8	5	201	Ashley Lee	DB	Atlanta Falcons	—
1985	10	18	270	Joe Jones	TE	Dallas Cowboys	—
1985	11	19	299	Allen Young (Note: Allen Young played basketball at Virginia Tech and not football.)	DB	New York Giants	—
1986	No selections						
1987	8	1	196	Eddie Hunter	RB	New York Jets	—
1987	8	13	208	Curtis Taliaferro	LB	Atlanta Falcons	—
1988	6	17	154	Steve Johnson	TE	New England Patriots	—
1988	12	1	306	Carter Wiley	DB	Atlanta Falcons	—
1988	12	5	310	Victor Jones	LB	Tampa Bay Buccaneers	—
1989	No selections						
1990	8	19	212	Jock Jones	LB	Cleveland Browns	—
1990	8	22	215	Roger Brown†	DB	Green Bay Packers	Super Bowl Champion (XXV)
1991	12	8	314	Al Chamblee	LB	Tampa Bay Buccaneers	—
1992	1	13	13	Eugene Chung (Note: Eugene Chung is Korean American, and was the first Asian American player to be drafted in the first round.)	T	New England Patriots	—
1992	4	23	107	Will Furrer	QB	Chicago Bears	—
1992	6	11	151	Damien Russell	DB	San Francisco 49ers	—
1992	7	19	187	William Boatwright	G	Philadelphia Eagles	—
1992	12	26	334	John Granby	WR	Denver Broncos	—
1993	No selections						
1994	2	22	62	Tyronne Drakeford†	CB	San Francisco 49ers	Super Bowl Champion (XXIX)
1994	4	18	121	John Burke	TE	New England Patriots	—
1994	7	6	200	Jim Pyne	C	Tampa Bay Buccaneers	—
1995	3	26	90	Antonio Freeman*†	WR	Green Bay Packers	Pro Bowl (1998); Super Bowl Champion (XXXI)
1995	4	26	124	Ken Brown	LB	Denver Broncos	—
1996	2	11	41	Bryan Still	WR	San Diego Chargers	—
1996	3	27	88	J. C. Price	DT	Carolina Panthers	—
1997	1	26	26	Jim Druckenmiller	QB	San Francisco 49ers	—
1997	2	19	49	Torrian Gray	S	Minnesota Vikings	—
1997	4	17	113	Antonio Banks	CB	Minnesota Vikings	—
1997	6	31	194	Cornell Brown†	DE	Baltimore Ravens	Super Bowl Champion (XXXV)
1998	4	12	104	Todd Washington†	C	Tampa Bay Buccaneers	Super Bowl Champion (XXXVII)
1998	4	17	109	Gennaro DiNapoli	G	Oakland Raiders	—
1998	7	12	201	Ken Oxendine	FB	Atlanta Falcons	—
1998	7	13	202	Marcus Parker	RB	Cincinnati Bengals	—
1999	4	15	110	Pierson Prioleau†	S	San Francisco 49ers	Super Bowl Champion (XLIV)
1999	5	32	165	Derek Smith	T	Washington Redskins	—
2000	2	4	35	John Engelberger	DT	San Francisco 49ers	—
2000	2	21	52	Ike Charlton	CB	Seattle Seahawks	—
2000	3	27	89	Corey Moore	LB	Buffalo Bills	—
2000	5	5	134	Anthony Midget	CB	Atlanta Falcons	—
2000	7	37	243	Shyrone Stith	RB	Jacksonville Jaguars	—
2001	1	1	1	Michael Vick*	QB	Atlanta Falcons	Pro Bowl (2002, 2004, 2005, 2010)
2001	3	29	91	Cory Bird	S	Indianapolis Colts	—
2001	5	6	137	Matt Lehr	G	Dallas Cowboys	—
2002	2	15	47	André Davis	WR	Cleveland Browns	—
2002	4	13	111	Ben Taylor	LB	Cleveland Browns	—
2002	5	13	148	Kevin McCadam	S	Atlanta Falcons	—
2002	6	10	182	David Pugh	DT	Indianapolis Colts	—
2002	6	39	211	Bob Slowikowski	TE	Dallas Cowboys	—
2002	7	7	218	Chad Beasley	T	Minnesota Vikings	—
2002	7	13	224	Derrius Monroe	DE	New Orleans Saints	—
2002	7	40	251	Jarrett Ferguson	FB	Buffalo Bills	—
2003	4	18	115	Lee Suggs	RB	Cleveland Browns	—
2003	7	38	252	Willie Pile	S	Kansas City Chiefs	—
2004	1	8	8	DeAngelo Hall*	CB	Atlanta Falcons	Pro Bowl (2005, 2006, 2010)
2004	1	30	30	Kevin Jones	RB	Detroit Lions	—
2004	2	13	45	Jake Grove	C	Oakland Raiders	—
2004	4	24	120	Ernest Wilford	WR	Jacksonville Jaguars	—
2004	5	13	145	Nathaniel Adibi	DE	Pittsburgh Steelers	—
2005	3	11	75	Eric Green	CB	Arizona Cardinals	—
2005	4	7	108	Vincent Fuller	S	Tennessee Titans	—
2005	6	7	217	Jon Dunn	T	Cleveland Browns	—
2006	2	5	37	Jimmy Williams	CB	Atlanta Falcons	—
2006	2	31	63	Darryl Tapp	DE	Seattle Seahawks	—
2006	3	24	88	James Anderson	LB	Carolina Panthers	—
2006	5	23	155	Jeff King	TE	Carolina Panthers	—
2006	6	8	177	Jonathan Lewis	DT	Arizona Cardinals	—
2006	7	14	222	Justin Hamilton	S	Cleveland Browns	—
2006	7	19	227	Jimmy Martin	T	San Diego Chargers	—
2006	7	26	234	Will Montgomery	G	Carolina Panthers	—
2006	7	32	240	Cedric Humes	RB	Pittsburgh Steelers	—
2007	3	26	89	Aaron Rouse	S	Green Bay Packers	—
2007	5	20	157	David Clowney	WR	Green Bay Packers	—
2007	5	26	163	Brandon Frye	T	Houston Texans	—
2008	1	26	26	Duane Brown*	T	Houston Texans	Pro Bowl (2012, 2013, 2014, 2018, 2021)
2008	2	3	35	Brandon Flowers*	CB	Kansas City Chiefs	Pro Bowl (2013)
2008	2	11	42	Eddie Royal	WR	Denver Broncos	—
2008	3	9	72	Chris Ellis	DE	Buffalo Bills	—
2008	4	19	118	Xavier Adibi	LB	Houston Texans	—
2008	5	13	148	Carlton Powell	DT	Denver Broncos	—
2008	6	8	174	Josh Morgan	WR	San Francisco 49ers	—
2008	7	8	215	Justin Harper	WR	Baltimore Ravens	—
2009	5	21	157	Victor "Macho" Harris	CB	Philadelphia Eagles	—
2010	2	20	52	Jason Worilds	DE	Pittsburgh Steelers	—
2010	5	2	133	Kam Chancellor*†	S	Seattle Seahawks	Super Bowl Champion (XLVIII); Pro Bowl (2011, 2013, 2014, 2015)
2010	5	9	140	Ed Wang	T	Buffalo Bills	—
2010	6	3	172	Brent Bowden	P	Tampa Bay Buccaneers	—
2010	7	4	211	Cody Grimm	LB	Tampa Bay Buccaneers	—
2011	2	6	38	Ryan Williams	RB	Arizona Cardinals	—
2011	4	30	127	Rashad "Roc" Carmichael	CB	Houston Texans	—
2011	6	15	180	Tyrod Taylor†	QB	Baltimore Ravens	Super Bowl Champion (XLVII); Pro Bowl (2015)
2012	1	32	32	David Wilson	RB	New York Giants	—
2012	3	31	94	Jayron Hosley	CB	New York Giants	—
2012	5	17	152	Danny Coale	WR	Dallas Cowboys	—
2013	6	3	171	Corey Fuller	WR	Detroit Lions	—
2013	6	5	173	Vinston Painter	T	Denver Broncos	—
2014	1	14	14	Kyle Fuller*	CB	Chicago Bears	Pro Bowl (2018, 2019)
2014	4	20	120	Logan Thomas	QB	Arizona Cardinals	—
2014	6	6	182	Antone Exum	CB	Minnesota Vikings	—
2015	6	5	181	Kyshoen Jarrett	S	Washington Redskins	—
2015	7	26	243	Laurence Gibson	T	Dallas Cowboys	—
2016	3	21	84	Kendall Fuller†	CB	Washington Redskins	Super Bowl Champion (LIV)
2016	6	28	203	Dadi Nicolas	LB	Kansas City Chiefs	—
2017	6	2	186	Chuck Clark	S	Baltimore Ravens	—
2017	6	17	201	Bucky Hodges	TE	Minnesota Vikings	—
2017	6	22	206	Sam Rogers	FB	Los Angeles Rams	—
2017	7	19	237	Isaiah Ford	WR	Miami Dolphins	—
2018	1	16	16	Tremaine Edmunds*	LB	Buffalo Bills	Pro Bowl (2019, 2020); First time two brothers chosen in 1st round of NFL draft
2018	1	28	28	Terrell Edmunds	DB	Pittsburgh Steelers	First time two brothers chosen in 1st round of NFL draft
2018	5	26	163	Tim Settle	DT	Washington Redskins	–
2018	5	29	166	Wyatt Teller	G	Buffalo Bills	–
2018	7	23	241	Greg Stroman	DB	Washington Redskins	–
2019	No selections						
2020	3	37	101	Dalton Keene	TE	New England Patriots	—
2021	1	22	22	Caleb Farley	DB	Tennessee Titans	—
2021	1	23	23	Christian Darrisaw	T	Minnesota Vikings	—
2021	3	16	80	Divine Deablo	DB	Las Vegas Raiders	—
2021	6	33	217	Khalil Herbert	RB	Chicago Bears	—
2022	5	34	177	James Mitchell	TE	Detroit Lions	—
2022	6	10	189	Amaré Barno	LB	Carolina Panthers	—
2022	6	31	209	Luke Tenuta	T	Buffalo Bills	—
2022	6	36	215	Lecitus Smith	G	Arizona Cardinals	—
2023	4	17	119	Chamarri Conner	DB	Kansas City Chiefs	—
2024	No selections						
2025	4	2	104	Bhayshul Tuten	RB	Jacksonville Jaguars	—
2025	4	26	128	Jaylin Lane	WR	Washington Commanders	—
2025	6	1	177	Dorian Strong	CB	Buffalo Bills	—
2025	6	33	209	Antwaun Powell-Ryland	DE	Philadelphia Eagles	—
2025	6	34	210	Aeneas Peebles	DT	Baltimore Ravens	—

== Notable undrafted players ==
Note: No drafts held before 1920

Debut year	Player name	Position	Debut NFL/AFL team	Notes
1973	Bill Ellenbogen	G	Kansas City Chiefs	—
1976	Billy Hardee	CB	Denver Broncos	—
1978	George Roberts	P	Miami Dolphins	—
1980	Mickey Fitzgerald	RB	Atlanta Falcons	—
1981	Dave Smigelsky	P	Washington Redskins	—
1983	Bill Renner	P	Minnesota Vikings	—
1984	Gary Smith	G	Cincinnati Bengals	—
1987	Donald Snell	WR	Seattle Seahawks	—
1996	J. C. Price	DE	Carolina Panthers	—
1997	Bill Conaty	C	Buffalo Bills	—
1999	Keion Carpenter	S	Buffalo Bills	—
2000	Shayne Graham	K	New Orleans Saints	—
2000	Michael Hawkes	LB	Carolina Panthers	—
2001	Dave Meyer	QB	Indianapolis Colts	—
2001	Nick Sorensen	S	St. Louis Rams	—
2003	Ronyell Whitaker	CB	Tampa Bay Buccaneers	—
2003	Grant Noel	QB	Baltimore Ravens	—
2004	Garnell Wilds	DB	Washington Redskins	—
2005	Bryan Randall	QB	Atlanta Falcons	—
2009	Sean Glennon	QB	Minnesota Vikings	—
2011	Darren Evans	RB	Indianapolis Colts	—
2011	Davon Morgan	S	New York Jets	—
2012	Jarrett Boykin	WR	Jacksonville Jaguars	—
2013	Marcus Davis	WR	New York Giants	—
2017	Jerod Evans	QB	Pittsburgh Steelers	—
2018	Cam Phillips	WR	Buffalo Bills	—
2019	Yosh Nijman	T	Green Bay Packers	—
2022	John Parker Romo	PK	New Orleans Saints	—
2022	Jordan Williams	DT	Miami Dolphins	—
2024	Pheldarius Payne	DT	Houston Texans	—
2025	Da'Quan Felton	WR	New York Giants	—
2025	Stephen Gosnell	WR	Buffalo Bills	—
2025	Keonta Jenkins	STAR	Buffalo Bills	—
2025	Collin Schlee	QB	Washington Commanders	—
2026	Kyron Drones	QB	Green Bay Packers	—
2026	Jaden Keller	LB	New York Jets	—
2026	Tomas Rimac	OG	Minnesota Vikings	—
2026	Terion Stewart	RB	Kansas City Chiefs	—
