= 1979 Sun Belt Conference men's basketball tournament =

- Classification: Division I
- Season: 1978–79
- Teams: 6
- Site: Charlotte Coliseum; Charlotte, NC
- Champions: Jacksonville (1st title)
- Winning coach: Tates Locke (1st title)
- MVP: James Ray (Jacksonville)

1978–79 Sun Belt Conference men's basketball standings
	Conf.				Overall
Team	W		L	PCT	W		L	PCT
South Alabama	10	–	0	1.000	20	–	7	.741
South Florida	6	–	4	.600	14	–	14	.500
UNC Charlotte	6	–	4	.600	16	–	11	.593
Jacksonville †	5	–	5	.500	19	–	11	.633
New Orleans	3	–	7	.300	11	–	16	.407
Georgia State	0	–	10	.000	7	–	20	.259
† 1979 Sun Belt Conference tournament winner Rankings from AP Poll

The 1979 Sun Belt Conference men's basketball tournament was held February 23–25 at the Charlotte Coliseum in Charlotte, North Carolina.

Jacksonville defeated South Florida in the championship game, 68–54, to win their first Sun Belt men's basketball tournament.

The Dolphins, in turn, received a bid for the 1979 NCAA tournament, where they lost to Virginia Tech in the first round. Top-seeded South Alabama, who lost to Jacksonville in the semifinal round, still received an at-large bid, falling to Louisville in the second round.

ESPN televised every game of the tournament. It was the first time that all the games of a college basketball conference championship tournament were televised.

== Format ==
All six of the conference's members participated in the tournament field. They were seeded based on regular season conference records with the top two teams earning byes to the semifinal round.

All of the games were played at the Charlotte Coliseum in Charlotte, North Carolina.

== Bracket ==
Quarterfinals; Friday, February 23
5	New Orleans	47
4	Jacksonville	56
3	UNC Charlotte	51
6	Georgia State	47

Semifinals; Saturday, February 24
1	South Alabama	77
4	Jacksonville	85
2	South Florida	50
3	UNC Charlotte	47

Championship; Sunday, February 25
4	Jacksonville	68
2	South Florida	54
