= 1978–79 South Alabama Jaguars basketball team =

American college basketball season

1978–79 South Alabama Jaguars men's basketball

Sun Belt Regular season champions

NCAA tournament, second round
- Conference: Sun Belt Conference
- East Division
- Record: 20–7 (10–0 Sun Belt)
- Head coach: Cliff Ellis (4th season)
- Home arena: Jaguar Gym; Mobile Municipal Auditorium

1978–79 Sun Belt Conference men's basketball standings
	Conf.				Overall
Team	W		L	PCT	W		L	PCT
South Alabama	10	–	0	1.000	20	–	7	.741
South Florida	6	–	4	.600	14	–	14	.500
UNC Charlotte	6	–	4	.600	16	–	11	.593
Jacksonville †	5	–	5	.500	19	–	11	.633
New Orleans	3	–	7	.300	11	–	16	.407
Georgia State	0	–	10	.000	7	–	20	.259
† 1979 Sun Belt Conference tournament winner Rankings from AP Poll

The 1978–79 South Alabama Jaguars basketball team represented the University of South Alabama during the 1978–79 NCAA Division I men's basketball season. The Jaguars were led by head coach Cliff Ellis, in his fourth year as head coach. They played their home games at the Mobile Civic Center, and were members of the Sun Belt Conference. They finished the season 20–7, 10–0 in Sun Belt play to finish in first place. They were upset by Jacksonville in the Sun Belt tournament, but did receive an at-large bid to the 1979 NCAA tournament as the No. 6 seed in the Midwest region. In the second round, the Jaguars lost to Louisville, 69–66.

== Roster ==
1978–79 South Alabama Jaguars men's basketball team
Players
Coaches

Pos.	#	Name	Height	Weight	Year	Hometown
F		Rory White	6 ft 8 in (2.03 m)	210 lb (95 kg)	So	Tuskegee, Alabama
F	15	Ed Rains	6 ft 7 in (2.01 m)	—	So	Ocala, Florida

Head coach

- Cliff Ellis (Florida State)

Assistant coach(es)

Legend

- (C) Team captain
- (S) Suspended
- (I) Ineligible
- (W) Walk-on
- Injured
- Current redshirt

== Schedule and results ==
Date time, TV	Rank^{#}	Opponent^{#}	Result	Record	Site (attendance) city, state
Regular season
Nov 25, 1978*		SIU Edwardsville	W 111–78	1–0	Jaguar Gym; Mobile, Alabama
Nov 30, 1978*		at Mississippi State	L 78–86	1–1	Humphrey Coliseum; Starkville, Mississippi
Dec 9, 1978*		at Northwestern State	W 79–66	2–1	Prather Coliseum; Natchitoches, Louisiana
Dec 11, 1978*		Georgia Southern	L 91–93	2–2	Jaguar Gym; Mobile, Alabama
Dec 14, 1978*		North Park	W 75–68	3–2	Jaguar Gym; Mobile, Alabama
Dec 18, 1978*		at UAB	L 72–75	3–3	BJCC Arena (5,483); Birmingham, Alabama
Dec 27, 1978*		Austin Peay; Senior Bowl Tournament	W 96–67	4–3	Mobile Municipal Auditorium; Mobile, Alabama
Dec 28, 1978*		Louisiana Tech; Senior Bowl Tournament	W 71–69	5–3	Mobile Municipal Auditorium; Mobile, Alabama
Dec 30, 1978*		Wisconsin–Whitewater	W 111–90	6–3	Jaguar Gym; Mobile, Alabama
Jan 8, 1979*		Houston Christian	W 97–74	7–3	Jaguar Gym; Mobile, Alabama
Jan 10, 1979*		at UNC Wilmington	L 63–65	7–4	Trask Coliseum; Wilmington, North Carolina
Jan 13, 1979*		Charlotte	W 71–60	8–4	Jaguar Gym; Mobile, Alabama
Jan 15, 1979		Georgia State	W 84–70	9–4 (1–0)	Jaguar Gym; Mobile, Alabama
Jan 18, 1979		at New Orleans	W 80–73	10–4 (2–0)	Human Performance Center; New Orleans, Louisiana
Jan 22, 1979		Jacksonville	W 72–61	11–4 (3–0)	Jaguar Gym; Mobile, Alabama
Jan 25, 1979		New Orleans	W 101–65	12–4 (4–0)	Jaguar Gym; Mobile, Alabama
Jan 29, 1979		at Georgia State	W 89–71	13–4 (5–0)	GSU Sports Arena; Atlanta, Georgia
Feb 1, 1979		South Florida	W 114–83	14–4 (6–0)	Jaguar Gym; Mobile, Alabama
Feb 6, 1979*		Florida State	W 78–61	15–4	Jaguar Gym; Mobile, Alabama
Feb 8, 1979*		UAB	W 71–69	16–4	Jaguar Gym (3,159); Mobile, Alabama
Feb 10, 1979		at Jacksonville	W 72–71	17–4 (7–0)	Jacksonville Memorial Coliseum; Jacksonville, Florida
Feb 12, 1979		at South Florida	W 73–61	18–4 (8–0)	Curtis Hixon Hall; Tampa, Florida
Feb 15, 1979*		Illinois State	L 70–77	18–5	Jaguar Gym; Mobile, Alabama
Feb 17, 1979*		at Charlotte	W 66–63	19–5	Charlotte Coliseum; Charlotte, North Carolina
Sun Belt Conference tournament
Feb 24, 1979*		vs. Jacksonville; Semifinals	L 77–85	19–6	Charlotte Coliseum; Charlotte, North Carolina
Regular season
Feb 28, 1979*		Northwestern State	W 97–91	20–6	Jaguar Gym; Mobile, Alabama
NCAA tournament
Mar 10, 1979*	(6 MW)	vs. (3 MW) No. 18 Louisville; Second round	L 66–69	20–7	Moody Coliseum; Dallas, Texas
*Non-conference game. ^{#}Rankings from AP Poll. (#) Tournament seedings in parentheses. MW=Midwest. All times are in Central Time.
