= 1978–79 UAB Blazers men's basketball team =

American college basketball season

1978–79 UAB Blazers men's basketball
- Conference: Independent
- Record: 15–11
- Head coach: Gene Bartow
- Assistant coaches: Oscar Catlin; Robert Corn; Lee Hunt
- Home arena: BJCC Arena

The inaugural 1978–79 UAB Blazers men's basketball team represented the University of Alabama at Birmingham (UAB) in the 1978–79 NCAA Division I men's basketball season. Led by head coach Gene Bartow, the Blazers competed as an independent and played their home games at the BJCC Arena. They finished the season 15–11.

== Roster ==
Name	Hometown
Tim Almquist	Forest Lake, Minnesota, United States
Derrick Bentley	Birmingham, Alabama, United States
Daryl Braden	Memphis, Tennessee, United States
Raymond Gause	Memphis, Tennessee, United States
George Jones	Memphis, Tennessee, United States
Greg Leet	Flat River, Missouri, United States
Bill McCammon	Palm Springs, California, United States
Leon Morris	Memphis, Tennessee, United States
Doug Owens	Plainfield, Indiana, United States
Oliver Robinson	Birmingham, Alabama, United States
Scott Simcik	Simi Valley, California, United States
Donnie Speer	Sylacauga, Alabama, United States
Larry Spicer	Memphis, Tennessee, United States

== Schedule and results ==
After losing to Nebraska 64–55 in their inaugural game, UAB completed the 1978–79 season with an overall record of 15–11 during their lone season competing as an independent.

Date time, TV	Opponent	Result	Record	Site (attendance) city, state
11/24/1978* no, no	Nebraska	L 55–64	0–1	BJCC Arena (14,800); Birmingham, Alabama
11/25/1978* no, no	San Francisco State	W 67–51	1–1	BJCC Arena (4,550); Birmingham, Alabama
11/29/1978* no, no	Oklahoma City	W 88–79	2–1	BJCC Arena (4,460); Birmingham, Alabama
12/1/1978* no, no	vs. Southern Illinois; Show Me Classic	L 72–80	2–2	Hearnes Center (5,600); Columbia, Missouri
12/2/1978* no, no	vs. Eastern Kentucky; Show Me Classic	W 88–77	3–2	Hearnes Center (5,499); Columbia, Missouri
12/9/1978* no, no	at Ole Miss	L 77–82 ^{OT}	3–3	Tad Smith Coliseum (3,357); Oxford, Mississippi
12/14/1978* no, no	Georgia State	W 100–81	4–3	BJCC Arena (5,975); Birmingham, Alabama
12/18/1978* no, no	South Alabama	W 75–72	5–3	BJCC Arena (5,483); Birmingham, Alabama
12/20/1978* no, no	Iowa State	W 79–67	6–3	BJCC Arena (5,846); Birmingham, Alabama
12/23/1978* no, no	St. Louis	W 73–70	7–3	BJCC Arena (5,128); Birmingham, Alabama
12/30/1978* no, no	Florida State	L 66–85	7–4	BJCC Arena (7,201); Birmingham, Alabama
1/5/1979* no, no	at Georgia State	L 61–64	7–5	GSU Sports Arena (914); Atlanta
1/6/1979* no, no	Illinois College	W 108–70	8–5	BJCC Arena (5,236); Birmingham, Alabama
1/10/1979* no, no	Southern Miss	W 93–87	9–5	BJCC Arena (4,671); Birmingham, Alabama
1/20/1979* no, no	at Iona	L 59–61	9–6	Hynes Athletic Center (2,020); New Rochelle, New York
1/25/1979* no, no	at South Florida	L 66–68	9–7	Curtis Hixon Hall (1,864); Tampa, Florida
1/27/1979* no, no	Jacksonville	L 76–84	9–8	BJCC Arena (8,171); Birmingham, Alabama
1/29/1979* no, no	at Southern Miss	W 60–59	10–8	Reed Green Coliseum (3,016); Hattiesburg, Mississippi
1/31/1979* no, no	Saint Joseph's	W 84–69	11–8	BJCC Arena (5,852); Birmingham, Alabama
2/2/1979* no, no	Hawaii	W 85–75	12–8	BJCC Arena (5,196); Birmingham, Alabama
2/3/1979* no, no	South Florida	W 81–65	13–8	BJCC Arena (9,240); Birmingham, Alabama
2/8/1979* no, no	at South Alabama	L 69–71	13–9	Mobile Civic Center (3,159); Mobile, Alabama
2/12/1979* no, no	at Jacksonville	L 52–54	13–10	Jacksonville Coliseum (3,055); Jacksonville, Florida
2/16/1979* no, no	at Hawaii	W 86–82 ^{OT}	14–10	Hawaiʻi International Center (3,055); Honolulu
2/22/1979* no, no	Drexel	W 77–60	15–10	BJCC Arena (5,195); Birmingham, Alabama
2/27/1979* no, no	at No. 15 DePaul	L 77–88	15–11	Alumni Hall (3,113); Chicago
*Non-conference game. (#) Tournament seedings in parentheses. All times are in Central Time.
