= William Brandon Glover =

American wrestler (born 1938)

Brandon Glover
Personal information
- Full name: William Brandon Glover
- Born: April 22, 1938 (age 88) Norfolk, Virginia, U.S.

Sport
- Sport: Wrestling
- Event: Folkstyle
- College team: Virginia Tech
Medal record
Collegiate Wrestling
Representing the Virginia Tech Hokies
NCAA Championships
Bronze medal – third place	1959 Iowa City	130 lb
SoCon Championships
Gold medal – first place	1957 Lexington	130 lb
Gold medal – first place	1958 Blacksburg	130 lb
Gold medal – first place	1959 Charleston	130 lb
Gold medal – first place	1960 Davidson	130 lb

William Brandon Glover (born April 22, 1938) was Virginia Tech's first All-American wrestler. He won all 26 of his dual meet matches during his four-year wrestling career, with 17 of those wins coming by pin.

Glover earned All-America honors in his sophomore year of 1959 when he was invited to participate in the NCAA championship in the 130 pound class. He lost his only career match in the semi-finals of the event, but came back to score a victory in the third-place match.

The product of Granby High School in Norfolk, Virginia, was a Southern Conference wrestling champion all four of his collegiate seasons and led Virginia Tech team in scoring three of his four years. He was also team captain his senior year. Glover was inducted into the Virginia Tech Sports Hall of Fame in 1988 as the first wrestler so honored.
