= Tates Locke =

American basketball coach (1937–2024)

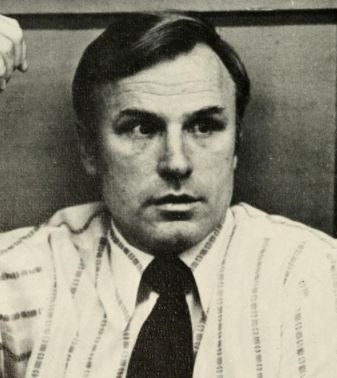
- Locke at Clemson in 1975

Biographical details
- Born: February 26, 1937; Batesville, Indiana, U.S.
- Died: May 15, 2024 (aged 87); Jacksonville, Florida, U.S.

Playing career
- 1957–1959: Ohio Wesleyan

Coaching career (HC unless noted)
- 1959–1960: Ohio Wesleyan (assistant)
- 1960–1963: Army (assistant)
- 1963–1965: Army
- 1965–1966: Miami (OH) (freshmen)
- 1966–1970: Miami (OH)
- 1970–1975: Clemson
- 1975–1976: Buffalo Braves (assistant)
- 1976–1977: Buffalo Braves
- 1978–1981: Jacksonville
- 1981–1983: UNLV (assistant)
- 1987–1989: Indiana (assistant)
- 1989–1994: Indiana State

Head coaching record
- Overall: 255–254 (college); 16–30 (NBA)
- Tournaments: 1–3 (NCAA University Division / Division I); 6–4 (NIT)

Accomplishments and honors

Championships
- MAC regular season (1969); Sun Belt tournament (1979)

Awards
- Sun Belt Coach of the Year (1980); MVC Coach of the Year (1991)

Taylor "Tates" Locke (February 25, 1937 – May 15, 2024) was an American basketball coach. He was described by Rick Telander in the March 8, 1982, issue of Sports Illustrated as being "as high-strung, aggressive and gung-ho over college coaching as anyone has ever been." He died in Jacksonville, Florida, on May 15, 2024, at the age of 87.

== Coaching career ==
Locke coached for West Point, where he hired Bob Knight as an assistant coach. Knight replaced Locke when Locke left West Point. After West Point, Locke moved on to Miami University in Oxford, Ohio, winning a MAC title in 1968–69.

Locke resigned from his Miami post to replace Bobby Roberts as head coach at Clemson University on March 18, 1970. After a season in which the Tigers had its best record in eight years at 17–11 and shared second place with North Carolina and North Carolina State in the Atlantic Coast Conference, he announced his resignation on March 20, 1975, amid a National Collegiate Athletic Association (NCAA) investigation into alleged violations involving offering money to recruit Moses Malone and furnishing cars to five Tigers players including Tree Rollins, Skip Wise and Stan Rome. Locke was succeeded by Bill Foster on April 9. Clemson's men's basketball program was placed on three years probation on October 7.

Locke's only experience at the professional level was made possible by Jack Ramsay who brought him to the Buffalo Braves as an assistant coach and chief scout beginning in 1975–76. When Ramsay's contract wasn't renewed the day after the Braves were eliminated by the Boston Celtics from the playoffs, Locke was promoted and signed a two-year contract to succeed him as the franchise's fourth head coach three days later on May 6, 1976. He vowed to build "one hell of an aggressive basketball team."

Once the 1976–77 season started, the Braves traded Bob McAdoo and Tom McMillen to the New York Knicks and Moses Malone to the Houston Rockets. Locke was also at odds with Ernie DiGregorio and John Shumate. With the Braves at 16–30, 13 1/2 games behind the Atlantic Division-leading Philadelphia 76ers and in the midst of a five-match losing streak, he was fired and replaced on an interim basis by general manager Bob MacKinnon on January 25, 1977.

He succeeded Don Beasley as head coach at Jacksonville University on March 23, 1978. He took the Dolphins to an NCAA berth and NIT berth.

After assistant stints at UNLV and Indiana, Locke would accept the head coach vacancy at Indiana State University. In his first season, he doubled the win total of his predecessor; in his second season, the Sycamores finished the season at 14-14 (.500) and Locke would be named MVC Coach of the Year. Though achieving modest success, he resigned under pressure after five seasons. He later worked as a scout and assistant general manager for the Portland Trail Blazers.

Locke co-authored with Bob Ibach Caught in the Net, a 1982 book about his transgressions as a college basketball head coach, primarily during his time at Clemson. The book inspired the 1994 film Blue Chips.

== Head coaching record ==
=== College ===
Record table
Season	Team	Overall	Conference	Standing	Postseason
Army Cadets (NCAA University Division independent) (1963–1965)
1963–64	Army	19–7			NIT Third Place
1964–65	Army	21–8			NIT Third Place
Army:		40–15			
Miami Redskins (Mid-American Conference) (1966–1970)
1966–67	Miami (OH)	14–10	7–5	3rd	
1967–68	Miami (OH)	11–12	4–8	5th	
1968–69	Miami (OH)	15–12	10–2	1st	NCAA University Division Regional Fourth Place
1969–70	Miami (OH)	16–8	7–3	T–2nd	
Miami (OH):		56–42	28–18		
Clemson Tigers (Atlantic Coast Conference) (1970–1975)
1970–71	Clemson	9–17	3–11	8th	
1971–72	Clemson	10–16	2–10	7th	
1972–73	Clemson	12–14	4–8	T–4th	
1973–74	Clemson	14–12	3–9	T–5th	
1974–75	Clemson	17–11	8–4	T–2nd	NIT first round
Clemson:		62–70	20–42		
Jacksonville Dolphins (Sun Belt Conference) (1978–1981)
1978–79	Jacksonville	19–11	5–5	4th	NCAA Division I first round
1979–80	Jacksonville	20–9	10–4	T–2nd	NIT first round
1980–81	Jacksonville	8–19	4–8	5th	
Jacksonville:		47–39	19-17		
Indiana State Sycamores (Missouri Valley Conference) (1989–1994)
1989–90	Indiana State	8–20	2–12	8th	
1990–91	Indiana State	14–14	9–7	T–4th	
1991–92	Indiana State	13–15	12–6	T–4th	
1992–93	Indiana State	11–17	7–11	T–7th	
1993–94	Indiana State	4–22	3–15	T–9th	
Indiana State:		50–88	33–51		
Total:		255–254			
National champion Postseason invitational champion Conference regular season champion Conference regular season and conference tournament champion Division regular season champion Division regular season and conference tournament champion Conference tournament champion

=== NBA ===
Legend
Regular season	G	Games coached	W	Games won	L	Games lost	W–L %	Win–loss %
Playoffs	PG	Playoff games	PW	Playoff wins	PL	Playoff losses	PW–L %	Playoff win–loss %

Team	Year	G	W	L	W–L%	Finish	PG	PW	PL	PW–L%	Result
Buffalo	1976–77	46	16	30	.348	(fired)	—	—	—	—	—
