= 1978–79 Jacksonville Dolphins men's basketball team =

American college basketball season

1978–79 Jacksonville Dolphins men's basketball

Sun Belt tournament champions

NCAA tournament
- Conference: Sun Belt Conference
- Record: 19–11 (5–5 Sun Belt)
- Head coach: Tates Locke (1st season)
- Home arena: Jacksonville Memorial Coliseum

1978–79 Sun Belt Conference men's basketball standings
	Conf.				Overall
Team	W		L	PCT	W		L	PCT
South Alabama	10	–	0	1.000	20	–	7	.741
South Florida	6	–	4	.600	14	–	14	.500
UNC Charlotte	6	–	4	.600	16	–	11	.593
Jacksonville †	5	–	5	.500	19	–	11	.633
New Orleans	3	–	7	.300	11	–	16	.407
Georgia State	0	–	10	.000	7	–	20	.259
† 1979 Sun Belt Conference tournament winner Rankings from AP Poll

The 1978–79 Jacksonville Dolphins men's basketball team represented Jacksonville University as members of the Sun Belt Conference during the 1978–79 NCAA Division I men's basketball season. The Dolphins, led by first-year head coach Tates Locke, played their home games at Jacksonville Memorial Coliseum in Jacksonville, Florida.

After finishing fourth in the Sun Belt regular season standings, Jacksonville won the conference tournament to receive an automatic bid to the NCAA tournament as No. 9 seed in the Midwest region. The team was beaten by No. 8 seed Virginia Tech, 70–53, in the opening round to end the season 19–11 (5–5 Sun Belt). This season closed out the most successful decade in program history, as four of the school's five NCAA tournament appearances all-time occurred during the 1970s.

== Roster ==
1978–79 Jacksonville Dolphins men's basketball team
Players
Coaches

Pos.	#	Name	Height	Weight	Year	Previous school	Hometown
F		Pete Boyle	6 ft 6 in (1.98 m)	—	Fr
G		Stan Conley	6 ft 0 in (1.83 m)	—	Fr
G		Paul DeVito	6 ft 3 in (1.91 m)	—	Fr
F		Singh Guram	6 ft 7 in (2.01 m)	—	Fr	Airport	India
F		Mike Hackett	6 ft 5 in (1.96 m)	—	Fr
G		Greg Harris	6 ft 0 in (1.83 m)	—	Jr
G		Frankie Lemmons	6 ft 5 in (1.96 m)	—	So
G		Jimmy Martin	6 ft 3 in (1.91 m)	—	So
G		Phil Parisi	5 ft 10 in (1.78 m)	—	So
F		James Ray	6 ft 8 in (2.03 m)	210 lb (95 kg)	Jr	L.B. Landry	New Orleans, LA
F		Dwayne Smith	6 ft 5 in (1.96 m)	—	So
C		Barlow Taylor	6 ft 9 in (2.06 m)	—	Fr
F		Steve Tutson	6 ft 7 in (2.01 m)	—	Fr
G		Anthony Williams	6 ft 0 in (1.83 m)	—	Sr

Head coach

- Tates Locke (Ohio Wesleyan)

Assistant coach(es)

Legend

- (C) Team captain
- (S) Suspended
- (I) Ineligible
- (W) Walk-on
- Injured
- Current redshirt

Roster

== Schedule and results ==
Date time, TV	Rank^{#}	Opponent^{#}	Result	Record	Site (attendance) city, state
Regular season
Nov 24, 1978*		Wake Forest	L 68–70	0–1	Jacksonville Memorial Coliseum; Jacksonville, Florida
Dec 2, 1978*		Memphis State	W 91–87	1–1	Jacksonville Memorial Coliseum; Jacksonville, Florida
Dec 6, 1978*		at Stetson	L 71–83	1–2	Edmunds Center; DeLand, Florida
Dec 9, 1978*		at No. 14 North Carolina	L 56–85	1–3	Carmichael Auditorium; Chapel Hill, North Carolina
Sun Belt Conference tournament
Feb 23, 1979*		vs. New Orleans; Quarterfinals	W 56–47	17–10	Charlotte Coliseum; Charlotte, North Carolina
Feb 24, 1979*		vs. South Alabama; Semifinals	W 85–77	18–10	Charlotte Coliseum; Charlotte, North Carolina
Feb 25, 1979*		vs. South Florida; Championship game	W 68–54	19–10	Charlotte Coliseum; Charlotte, North Carolina
NCAA tournament
Mar 9, 1979*	(9 MW)	vs. (8 MW) Virginia Tech; First round	L 53–70	19–11	Allen Fieldhouse; Lawrence, Kansas
*Non-conference game. ^{#}Rankings from AP Poll. (#) Tournament seedings in parentheses. MW=Midwest. All times are in Eastern.
