= Sonny Utz =

American football player (1942–1991)

No. 28
- Position: Fullback

Personal information
- Born: May 21, 1942; Annandale, Virginia, U.S.
- Died: December 31, 1991 (aged 49)
- Listed height: 6 ft 0 in (1.83 m)
- Listed weight: 208 lb (94 kg)

Career information
- High school: Annandale (VA)
- College: Virginia Tech
- NFL draft: 1965: 6th round, 75th overall pick
- AFL draft: 1965: 13th round, 100th overall pick

Career history
- Dallas Cowboys (1965–1966)*; Atlanta Falcons (1967)*; Winnipeg Blue Bombers (1967)
- * Offseason or practice squad member only

Awards and highlights
- All-SoCon (1964); SoCon rushing leader, 1964; 3rd place, 1963; 2× SoCon scoring leader (1963, 1964)

Silas Alexander "Sonny" Utz, III (May 21, 1942 - December 31, 1991) was an American professional football fullback in the Canadian Football League (CFL) for the Winnipeg Blue bombers. He also was a member of the Dallas Cowboys in the National Football League (NFL). He played college football at Virginia Tech.

== Early life ==
Utz attended Annandale High School, where he practiced football and baseball. He contributed to the school winning four consecutive county football championships. As a senior, he received All-Met and All Northern Region honors.

== College career ==
Utz accepted a football scholarship from Virginia Tech. He was referred to as "Mr. Inside" as a fullback in the Tech offense that featured star quarterback Bob Schweickert, who was called "Mr. Outside." He also played as a linebacker.

=== 1962 season ===
Utz was one of four backs who ran for over 250 yards for the Gobblers, racking up 261 yards on 66 carries. He scored one touchdown for the 5-5 Techmen.

=== 1963 season ===
Utz led the conference in scoring for the only Virginia Tech team to ever win the Southern Conference title. He scored 10 touchdowns in 10 games for the Hokies who finished the year 8-2 and with a perfect 5-0 conference mark. He also was second to Sweickert on the team in rushing with 567 yards. That was good enough for third place in the Southern Conference.

=== 1964 season ===
In the 1964 season, Utz led the Southern in both rushing and scoring. However, the Hokies lost to West Virginia to spoil their bid for back-to-back Southern Conference championships. Utz scored 10 times on the ground in 10 games for the second straight year, but also caught a pass for a touchdown to tally a total of 66 points.

His accomplishments led to his induction into the Virginia Tech Sports Hall of Fame in 1987.

== Professional career ==
Utz was selected by the Dallas Cowboys in the 6th round (75th overall) of the 1965 NFL draft. He also was selected by the New York Jets in the 13th round (100th overall) of the 1965 AFL draft. He opted to sign with the Cowboys, but missed all of training camp due to ankle injury he suffered in a motorcycle accident the previous spring. On August 24, 1966, he was waived to be placed on the injured reserve list.

On April 11, 1967, he signed as a free agents with the Atlanta Falcons. He was released on July 21.

In August 1967, he was signed as a free agent by the Winnipeg Blue Bombers of the Canadian Football League. He registered 12 carries for 16 yards, 15 receptions for 145 yards and 12 kickoff returns for 272 yards. He was released in October.
