= 1978–79 Virginia Tech Hokies men's basketball team =

American college basketball season

1978–79 Virginia Tech Hokies men's basketball

Metro Conference tournament champions

NCAA tournament
- Conference: Metro Conference (1975–1995)
- Record: 22–9 (4–6 Metro)
- Head coach: Charles Moir (3rd season)
- Home arena: Cassell Coliseum

1978–79 Metro Conference men's basketball standings
	Conf.				Overall
Team	W		L	PCT	W		L	PCT
No. 13 Louisville	9	–	1	.900	24	–	8	.750
Florida State	7	–	3	.700	19	–	10	.655
Memphis State	5	–	5	.500	13	–	15	.464
Virginia Tech †	4	–	6	.400	22	–	9	.710
Cincinnati	4	–	6	.400	13	–	14	.481
Saint Louis	3	–	7	.300	10	–	17	.370
Tulane	2	–	8	.200	8	–	19	.296
† 1979 Metro Conference tournament winner Rankings from AP Poll

The 1978–79 Virginia Tech Hokies men's basketball team represented Virginia Polytechnic Institute and State University from Blacksburg, Virginia as members of the Metro Conference during the 1978–79 season. The Hokies were led by head coach Charles Moir and played their home games at Cassell Coliseum in Blacksburg, Virginia. After finishing fourth in the Metro regular season standings, Virginia Tech captured the conference tournament title to secure a bid to the NCAA tournament. As No. 8 seed in the Midwest region, the team beat No. 9 seed Jacksonville in the opening round before losing to eventual National runner-up Indiana State and superstar Larry Bird.

== Roster ==
1978–79 Virginia Tech Hokies men's basketball team
Players	Coaches
Pos. / # / Name / Height / Weight / Year / Previous school / Hometown; F / 40 / Wayne Robinson / 6 ft 8 in (2.03 m) / — / Jr / Greensboro Day School / Greensboro, North Carolina	Head coach: Charles Moir (Appalachian State); Assistant coach(es) Legend: (C) Team captain; (S) Suspended; (I) Ineligible; (W) Walk-on; Injured; Current redshirt; Roster

== Schedule and results ==
Date time, TV	Rank^{#}	Opponent^{#}	Result	Record	Site city, state
Regular Season
Feb 3, 1979*		vs. No. 4 North Carolina; North-South Doubleheader	L 80–92 ^{OT}	12–7	Charlotte Coliseum; Charlotte, North Carolina
Feb 7, 1979*		Old Dominion	W 91–85	13–7	Cassell Coliseum; Blacksburg, Virginia
Feb 10, 1979*		vs. Virginia	L 72–78	13–8	Roanoke Civic Center; Roanoke, Virginia
Feb 12, 1979*		at William & Mary	W 55–49	14–8	William & Mary Hall; Williamsburg, Virginia
Feb 17, 1979*		Georgia Southern	W 104–84	15–8	Cassell Coliseum; Blacksburg, Virginia
Feb 19, 1979		at Cincinnati	W 76–75	16–8 (4–6)	Riverfront Coliseum; Cincinnati, Ohio
Feb 21, 1979*		West Virginia	W 73–61	17–8	Cassell Coliseum; Blacksburg, Virginia
Feb 24, 1979*		at Richmond	W 93–91	18–8	Robins Center; Richmond, Virginia
Metro Tournament
Mar 1, 1979*		vs. Cincinnati; Quarterfinals	W 80–74	19–8	Mid-South Coliseum; Memphis, Tennessee
Mar 2, 1979*		vs. No. 13 Louisville; Semifinals	W 72–68	20–8	Mid-South Coliseum; Memphis, Tennessee
Mar 3, 1979*		vs. Florida State; Championship game	W 68–60	21–8	Mid-South Coliseum; Memphis, Tennessee
NCAA Tournament
Mar 9, 1979*	(8 MW)	vs. (9 MW) Jacksonville; First round	W 70–53	22–8	Allen Fieldhouse; Lawrence, Kansas
Mar 11, 1979*	(8 MW)	vs. (1 MW) No. 1 Indiana State; Second round	L 69–86	22–9	Allen Fieldhouse; Lawrence, Kansas
*Non-conference game. ^{#}Rankings from AP Poll. (#) Tournament seedings in parentheses.
