= 1979 Metro Conference men's basketball tournament =

- Classification: Division I
- Season: 1978–79
- Teams: 7
- Site: Mid-South Coliseum; Memphis, TN
- Champions: Virginia Tech (1st title)
- Winning coach: Charles Moir (1st title)
- MVP: Dale Solomon (Virginia Tech)

1978–79 Metro Conference men's basketball standings
	Conf.				Overall
Team	W		L	PCT	W		L	PCT
No. 13 Louisville	9	–	1	.900	24	–	8	.750
Florida State	7	–	3	.700	19	–	10	.655
Memphis State	5	–	5	.500	13	–	15	.464
Virginia Tech †	4	–	6	.400	22	–	9	.710
Cincinnati	4	–	6	.400	13	–	14	.481
Saint Louis	3	–	7	.300	10	–	17	.370
Tulane	2	–	8	.200	8	–	19	.296
† 1979 Metro Conference tournament winner Rankings from AP Poll

The 1979 Metro Conference men's basketball tournament was held March 1–3 at the Mid-South Coliseum in Memphis, Tennessee.

Conference newcomers Virginia Tech defeated Florida State in the championship game, 68–60, to win their first Metro men's basketball tournament.

The Hokies, in turn, received a bid to the 1979 NCAA Tournament. They would be joined in the NCAA field by regular season champions Louisville, who lost to Virginia Tech in the tournament's semifinal round.

== Format ==
All seven of the conference's members participated in the tournament field. They were seeded based on regular season conference records, with the top team earning a bye into the semifinal round. The other six teams entered into the preliminary first round.

This was the first tournament for Virginia Tech, who joined the Metro Conference after playing as an Independent. They replaced Georgia Tech, who departed for the Atlantic Coast Conference prior to the season.

== Bracket ==
First round Thursday, March 1
5	Cincinnati	74
4	Virginia Tech	80
3	Memphis State	62
6	Saint Louis	58
7	Tulane	92
2	Florida State	101

Semifinals; Friday, March 2
1	Louisville	68
4	Virginia Tech	72
3	Memphis State	34
2	Florida State	35

Championship; Saturday, March 3
4	Virginia Tech	68
2	Florida State	60
