= List of Virginia Tech Sports Hall of Fame inductees =

curry The Virginia Tech Sports Hall of Fame was established in 1982 to honor and preserve the memory of athletes, coaches, administrators and staff members who have made outstanding contributions to athletics at Virginia Tech.

| Name of Inductee | Induction year | Sport (and/or role) | VT Seasons played/ Coached/ Other | National Collegiate Honors |
|---|---|---|---|---|
| Carpenter, Hunter | 1982 | Football | 1900–1903, 1905 | College Football Hall of Fame |
| Dale, Carroll | 1982 | Football | 1956–1959 | College Football Hall of Fame; All-America (1st team), 1959; All-America (2nd team), 1958 |
| Miles, C. P. "Sally" | 1982 | Football, Coach (F), Athletic Director | 1900–1902, 1905–1906, 1908, 1913; 1920–1934 | |
| Loria, Frank | 1982 | Football | 1965–1967 | College Football Hall of Fame; All-America (1st team), 1966; Consensus All-America, 1967; Academic All-America, 1967 |
| Moseley, Frank | 1982 | Coach, Athletic Director | 1951–1960; 1951–1978 | |
| Smith, Chris | 1982 | Basketball (M) | 1957–1961 | All-America (Hon Mention), 1960 |
| Laird, G. F. "Red" | 1983 | Coach (BaseB) | 1940–1943, 1947–1973 | |
| Oates, Johnny | 1983 | Baseball | 1966–1967 | |
| McEver, H. M. "Mac" | 1983 | Football, Coach, Administrator | 1925–1928; 1937–1944 | |
| Peake, Frank | 1983 | Football | 1926–1928 | |
| Preas, George | 1983 | Football | 1951–1954 | |
| Schweickert, Bob | 1983 | Football | 1962–1964 | All-America (3rd), 1963; All-America (1st team), 1964 |
| Bristow, Allan | 1984 | Basketball (M) | 1970–1973 | |
| Dear, Paul "Buddy" | 1984 | Baseball, Basketball (M) | 1924–1927 | |
| Younger, William "Monk" | 1984 | Football, Coach, Athletic Director | 1916–1917; 1920–1923, 1932–1937; 1935–1950 | |
| Burke, Leo | 1985 | Football, Baseball | 1952–1956 | |
| Collins, Tim | 1985 | Golf (M) | 1964–1967 | All-America (3rd team), 1965; All-America (2nd team), 1967 |
| Nutter, Madison "Buzz" | 1985 | Football | 1950–1952 | |
| Strock, Don | 1985 | Football | 1970–1972 | All-America (3rd team), 1972 |
| Wetzel, John | 1985 | Basketball (M) | 1963–1967 | |
| Bushkar, Harry | 1986 | Baseball, Basketball (M) | 1942–1946 | |
| Henry, Mel | 1986 | Football, Basketball (M), Baseball | 1935-1938 | |
| Parrish, George | 1986 | Football, Basketball (M), Track & Field | 1918-1921 | |
| Redd, Henry | 1986 | Football, Coach (MBB, F) | 1915–16, 1919–20; 1926-27 (MBB), 1932-40 (F) | |
| Wright, Howie | 1986 | Football, Baseball | 1952–1954 | |
| Beard, Dickie | 1987 | Football | 1952–1955 | |
| Combs, Glen | 1987 | Basketball (M) | 1966-1968 | |
| Crisp, Hank | 1987 | Football | 1917-1920 | |
| Motley, Ed | 1987 | Trainer | 1952- | |
| Utz, Sonny | 1987 | Football | 1962–1964 | |
| Beasley, Tom | 1988 | Football | 1973–1976 | |
| Bell, Wilson | 1988 | Faculty Rep | | |
| Glover, Brandon | 1988 | Wrestling | 1957-1960 | All-America (3rd pl., 130 lbs, 1959) |
| Widger, Mike | 1988 | Football | 1967–1969 | All-America (1st team), 1968 |
| Foussekis, George | 1989 | Football | 1965-1967 | All-America (2nd team), 1966 |
| Johnson, Stuart | 1989 | Track & Field | | |
| Melear, Leland "Lee" | 1989 | Basketball (M), Baseball | 1960- | |
| Thomas, Herb | 1989 | Football | 1938–1940 | |
| Ayersman, Bob | 1990 | Basketball (M) | 1957-1961 | |
| Burrows, Jack | 1990 | Tennis (M) | 1968-70 | |
| Buchanan, Bill | 1990 | Tennis (M), Coach (T), Administrator | | |
| Esleeck, Dick | 1990 | Football, Coach | 1924-26 | |
| Gaines, Jerry | 1990 | Track & Field | 1967-70 | |
| Grossman, Bill | 1990 | Swimming | 1956-58 | |
| Whitley, Ken | 1990 | Football, Wrestling | 1963–1964, 1966 | |
| Casey, Al | 1991 | Football | 1932–1933 | |
| Moran, Joe | 1991 | Football | | |
| Banks, Mac | 1991 | Track & Field | | |
| Mills, Lewis | 1991 | Basketball (M) | | |
| Weisend, Wendy | 1991 | Sports Information Dir. | | |
| Grinus, Bill | 1992 | Football | | |
| Hall, Earl "Bus" | 1992 | Basketball (M) | | |
| Hooper, H. V. (Byrd) | 1992 | Football, Baseball | | |
| Neff, Keith | 1992 | Track & Field | | All-America (5th pl. Pole Vault), 1976 |
| Pardue, Howard | 1992 | Basketball (M) | | All-America (Hon Mention), 1962 |
| Powell, James Franklin | 1992 | Football, Baseball | | |
| Stubbs, Franklin | 1992 | Baseball | 1979-1982 | All-America (1st team), 1981; All-America (1st team), 1982 |
| Hawk (Banks), Lucy | 1993 | Track & Field | | All-America (800m), 1980 |
| Keller, Bucky | 1993 | Basketball (M) | | All-America (Hon. Mention), 1962 |
| Matthews, Bill | 1993 | Basketball (M), Coach (MBB), Assoc AD | | |
| Prater, Jack | 1993 | Football, Administrator | 1951, 1954–1955 | |
| Beskin, Roy | 1993 | Tennis (M) | | |
| Andes, Milton | 1994 | Wrestling | | |
| Bullock, Richard | 1994 | Team Physician | | |
| Lessman (Stonick), Jenny | 1994 | Volleyball (W) | | Academic All-America (3rd team), 1982 |
| McClary, Neff | 1994 | Golf (M) | | |
| Johnson, Mike | 1994 | Football | 1980–1983 | Academic All-America (2nd Team), 1982 |
| Solomon, Dale | 1994 | Basketball (M) | | |
| King (Steel), Linda | 1995 | Track & Field | | All-America (6th pl. 10 km [OD]), 1984; All-America (4th pl. 10 km [OD]) 1985 |
| Paige, Tony | 1995 | Football | 1980–1983 | |
| Ripley, Louis P. | 1995 | Team Surgeon | | |
| Smith, Bruce | 1995 | Football | 1981–1984 | College Football Hall of Fame; Outland Trophy, 1984; Consensus All-America, 1984; All-America (1st team), 1983 |
| Teske, Frank | 1995 | Coach (Wrestling) | | |
| Harvey, Waddey | 1995 | Football | 1966–1968 | |
| Arnold, Dick | 1996 | Track | | |
| Curry, Dell | 1996 | Basketball (M) | 1982-1986 | All-America (1st team) |
| Sellers, Connie | 1996 | Golf (M) | 1951 | |
| Beamer, Frank | 1997 | Football, Coach (F) | 1966–1968; 1987–2015 | College Football Hall of Fame; Consensus National Coach of the Year, 1999 |
| Lawrence, Cyrus | 1997 | Football | 1979–1982 | |
| Dennis, Reneé | 1997 | Basketball (W) | | |
| Razzano, Rick | 1997 | Football | 1974–1977 | |
| Stewart, Jim | 1997 | Baseball | | All-America (1st team), 1982 |
| Wingo, Sterling | 1997 | Football, Baseball, Track & Field | 1947–1950 | |
| Brown, Robert | 1998 | Football | 1980–1981 | All-America (2nd team), 1981 |
| Cundiff, Berkeley "Berky" | 1998 | Baseball | | |
| Divers, Don | 1998 | Football | 1954–1956 | |
| King, Loyd | 1998 | Basketball (M) | | |
| Lewis, Kenny | 1998 | Football, Track | 1977–1979 | All-America, 55M high hurdles (3rd pl), 1980 (ID) |
| Barefoot, Ken | 1999 | Football | 1965–1967 | |
| Ferrell, Eddie | 1999 | Trainer | | |
| Phillips, Bob | 1999 | Track & Field | | All-America (5th pl. pole vault), 1980 |
| Taylor, Steve | 1999 | Cross Country, Track & Field | | All-America (CC), 1987; All-America (10K), 1987 |
| Ware, Ted | 1999 | Basketball (M) | | |
| Burnop, Mike | 2000 | Football | 1969–1971 | |
| Coles, Bimbo | 2000 | Basketball (M) | | All-America (HM), 1990 |
| Edwards, Ken | 2000 | Football | 1967–1969 | |
| McKee (Taylor), Lori | 2000 | Cross Country, Track & Field | | All-America (CC), 1981 |
| Smith, Bobby | 2000 | Football | 1941, 1946–1947 | |
| Luczak, Ki | 2000 | Football | 1949–1951 | |
| Byrne (Feathers), Amy | 2001 | Basketball (W) | 1987-1990 | |
| Canale, George | 2001 | Baseball | | All-America (1st team), 1986 |
| Oakes, Don | 2001 | Football | 1958–1960 | |
| Soulen (Gilbert), Margaret | 2001 | Swimming | | All-America (HM, 13th, 100 Back), 1989; All-America (HM, 13th, 200 Back), 1989 |
| Scales, Ricky | 2001 | Football | 1972–1974 | |
| Vandevender, Sherman | 2001 | Wrestling | | |
| Breen, Gene | 2002 | Football, Wrestling | 1961-63 | |
| Fitzegerald, Mickey | 2002 | Football | 1976-1979 | |
| Grossmann, Bob | 2002 | Swimming | | |
| Hartman, Chuck | 2002 | Coach (BB) | 1979–2006 | |
| Williams, Judy | 2002 | Cross Country, Track & Field | | All-America (10K) 1981 |
| Claiborne, Jerry | 2003 | Coach (F) | 1961-1970 | College Football Hall of Fame |
| Davidson, Ron | 2003 | Football | 1966–1968 | |
| Jones (Thompson), Anne | 2003 | Tennis (W), Coach (T) | | |
| Robinson, Wayne | 2003 | Basketball (M) | 1975-1979 | |
| Scott, Dennis | 2003 | Track & Field, Football | 1976–1978 | All-America (5th pl. 60-yard), 1978 |
| Pyne, Jim | 2004 | Football | 1990–1993 | Unanimous All-America, 1993 |
| Pikalek, Lisa | 2004 | Volleyball (W) | | Academic All-America (2nd team), 1991; Academic All-America of the Year, 1992 |
| Redding, Dick | 2004 | Coach | | |
| Wingfield, Bob | 2004 | Track & Field | | |
| Williams, Mike | 2004 | Baseball | | |
| Hardee, Billy | 2005 | Football | 1973–1975 | |
| Robin Lee | 2005 | Basketball (W) | | |
| Stickley, Mark | 2005 | Track & Field, Cross Country | | All-America (8th pl., 10 km) |
| Strock, Terry | 2005 | Football | 1959–1961 | |
| Taylor, Armand | 2005 | Wrestling | | |
| Crittenden, Ray | 2006 | Soccer (M), Football | | |
| Freeman, Antonio | 2006 | Football | 1991–1994 | |
| Moir, Charlie | 2006 | Coach (MBB) | | |
| Osborne, Christi | 2006 | Basketball (W) | | Academic All-America (2nd team), 1994; Academic All-America (1st team), 1995 |
| Kramer, Marcus | 2006 | Tennis (M) | | |
| Custis, Ace | 2007 | Basketball (M) | 1993–1997 | |
| Mayo, Oliver | 2007 | Tennis (M) | | All-America 1996 |
| McCoy, Trey | 2007 | Baseball | | All-America (3rd Team), 1987 |
| Root (Price), Jenny | 2007 | Basketball (W) | | All-America (HM) |
| Brown, Cornell | 2007 | Football | 1993–1996 | Consensus All-America, 1995; All-America (1st team), 1996 |
| Beard, Jim | 2008 | Baseball | | |
| Chung, Eugene | 2008 | Football | 1988-91 | All-America (1st team) 1991 |
| McClellan, Eric | 2008 | Soccer (M) | | |
| Ollendick, Katie | 2008 | Track & Field | | Academic All-America (1st team), 1997; All-America (12th pl, H-Jump [ID]), 1998; All-America (8th pl., Hept [OD]), 1998; Academic All-America of the Year, 1998 |
| Robertson Jr., James I. "Bud" | 2008 | Faculty Rep | | |
| Crane, Gene | 2009 | Track & Field | 1974-1979 | |
| DeShazo, Maurice | 2009 | Football | 1990–1994 | |
| Marchetti, Aaron | 2009 | Tennis (M) | 1995–1999 | All-America, 1999 |
| Noe, Chuck | 2009 | Coach (MBB) | 1955–1962 | |
| Sharp, Brian | 2009 | Golf (M) | 1991–1995 | |
| Witherspoon, Lisa | 2009 | Basketball (W) | 1995–1999 | All-America (HM), 1999 |
| Bunn, Gene | 2010 | Football | 1976-78 | |
| Meadows, Michelle | 2010 | Softball | | Academic All-America (3rd team), 1998; Academic All-America (1st team), 1999; Academic All-America (1st team), 2000 |
| Moore, Corey | 2010 | Football | 1997–1999 | College Football Hall of Fame; Unanimous All-America, 1999; Lombardi Award, 1999; Nagurski Award, 1999 |
| Thorpe, Duke | 2010 | Basketball (M) | | |
| Shiflet (Hackbirth), Laurie | 2010 | Tennis (W) | | |
| Clontz, Brad | 2011 | Baseball | 1990–1995 | |
| Feldman, Josh | 2011 | Wrestling | 1989–1994 | All-America (7th pl. HWT, 1994) |
| Graham, Shayne | 2011 | Football | 1996–1999 | |
| Moody, John | 2011 | Football, Administrator | 1952–1953,1956–1957; 1972–2013 | |
| Rogers, Phil | 2011 | Football | 1972–1975 | |
| Williams, Tere | 2011 | Basketball (W) | 1997–2001 | All-America (HM) |
| Braine, Dave | 2012 | Athletic Director | 1988–1997 | |
| Davis, André | 2012 | Football, Track & Field | 1998–2001 | All-America (1st team), 2000; Academic All-America (1st team), 2001 |
| McCloskey, Sharon | 2012 | Assoc AD | | |
| Sergent, Mike | 2012 | Track & Field | | All-America (5th pl. Hammer), 1992 |
| Wetzel (Doolan), Amy | 2012 | Basketball (W) | 1999-2001 | |
| Beecher, Bobby | 2013 | Basketball (M) | | |
| Crowel, Clarisa | 2013 | Softball | | |
| Engelberger, John | 2013 | Football | 1996–1999 | All-America (2nd team), 1999 |
| Milley, Jimmy | 2013 | Tennis (M) | | |
| Saunders, Joe | 2013 | Baseball | | |
| Wagner, Johnson | 2013 | Golf (M) | | All-America (3rd team), 2002 |
| deJonge, Brendon | 2014 | Golf (M) | | All-America (2nd team), 2002; All-America (2nd team), 2003 |
| Dobbe, Ashlee | 2014 | Softball | | Academic All-America (1st team), 2002 |
| Will (Cliffe), Dawn | 2014 | Lacrosse (W) | | All-America (HM), 1999; All-America (3rd team), 2000 |
| Grove, Jake | 2014 | Football | 2000, 2002–2003 | Unanimous All-America, 2003; Rimington Trophy, 2003 |
| Kublina, Ieva | 2014 | Basketball (W) | | |
| Suggs, Lee | 2014 | Football | 1999-2002 | All-America (3rd team), 2000 |
| Byrd (Mosley), April | 2015 | Track & Field | 1996-2000 | |
| Coles, Roscoe | 2015 | Football | 1974–1977 | |
| Furrer, Will | 2015 | Football | 1988–1991 | |
| Gray, Sean | 2015 | Wrestling | | All-America (6th pl., 141 lbs), 2001 |
| Lagan, Duane | 2015 | Team Physician | | |
| Randall, Bryan | 2015 | Football | 2001–2004 | |
| Gardin, Kerri | 2016 | Basketball (W) | | |
| Hall, DeAngelo | 2016 | Football | 2001–2003 | All-America (2nd team), 2003 |
| Jones, Kevin | 2016 | Football | 2001–2003 | Consensus All-America, 2003 |
| Jullien, Spyridon | 2016 | Track & Field | 2002-2006 | All-America (6th pl., Hammer [OD]), 2003; All-America (4th pl., Weight Throw [OD]), 2004; All-America (4th pl., Hammer [OD]), 2004; Nat'l Champion-All America (Weight Throw [ID]), 2005; Nat'l Champion-All America (Hammer [OD]), 2005; Nat'l Champion-All America (Weight Throw [ID]), 2006; Nat'l Champion-All America (Hammer [OD]), 2006 |
| Lee, Ashlee | 2016 | Football | 1980–1981, 1983–1984 | |
| Weaver, Jim | 2016 | Athletic Director | 1997–2013 | |
| Buheller, Tim | 2017 | Baseball | | |
| Dowell, Zabian | 2017 | Basketball (M) | 2003-2007 | - |
| Evans, Megan | 2017 | Softball | 2002-2005 | |
| Taylor, Ben | 2017 | Football | 1998–2001 | All-America (3rd team), 2000; All-America (2nd), 2001 |
| Vick, Michael | 2017 | Football | 1999–2000 | All-America (1st team), 1999 |
| Botzum (Cockrill), Jessica | 2018 | Swimming | 2005-2008 | All-America (7th pl. 200 Breast), 2005; All-America (Hon Men, 100 Breast), 2005; All-America (Hon Men 200 Breast), 2006; All-America (4th pl. 200 Breast), 2007; All-America (8th pl. 100 Breast), 2007; All-America (5th pl. 100 Breast), 2008; All-America (6th pl. 200 Breast), 2008; All-America (Hon Men 200 Medley Relay), 2008; All-America (Hon Men 400 Medley Relay), 2008; Academic All-America (2nd team), 2008 |
| Holsclaw, Billy | 2018 | Football | 1956–1958 | |
| Nyarko, Patrick | 2018 | Soccer (M) | | - |
| Royal, Eddie | 2018 | Football | 2004-2007 | |
| Tapp, Darryl | 2018 | Football | 2002–2005 | All-America (1st team), 2005 |
| Ticher (O'Brien), Angela | 2018 | Softball | 2005-2008 | All-America (2nd team), 2006; Academic All-America (2nd team), 2006; All-America (1st team), 2007; Academic All-America (1st team), 2007; All-America (1st team), 2008; Academic All-America of the Year, 2008 |
| Fanning, Tasmin | 2019 | Cross Country, Track & Field | 2005-2008 | All-America (4th pl., Distance Medley Relay), 2007; All-America (12th pl., Cross Country), 2007; All-America (6th pl., 5,000 meters OD), 2008; All-America (3rd pl., Cross Country), 2008 |
| Flowers, Brandon | 2019 | Football | 2005-2007 | All-America (3rd team), 2006; All-America (1st team) 2007 |
| Griswold, Matt | 2019 | Baseball | | All-America (3rd team), 1997 |
| Smith, Dave | 2019 | Sports Information Dir. | 1975-2015 | |
| Walter, Brian | 2019 | Cross Country, Track & Field | 1987-1990 | All-America Cross Country (30th place), 1989 |
| Weaver, Drew | 2019 | Golf | 2005-2009 | All-America (3rd team), 2009 |
| Adibi, Xavier | 2021 | Football | 2004-2007 | All-America (1st team), 2007 |
| Castlin, Kristi | 2021 | Track & Field | | All-America (9th, 60m hurdles), 2007 (ID); All-America (9th, 100m hurdles), 2007 (OD); All-America (2nd, 60m hurdles), 2008 (ID); All-America (3rd, 60m hurdles), 2009 (ID); All-America (2nd, 100m hurdles), 2009 (OD); All-America (2nd, 60m hurdles), 2010 (ID); All-America (4th, 100m hurdles), 2010 (OD) |
| Davound (Hendrick), Jackie | 2021 | Diving | 1995-1999 | |
| Drakeford, Tyronne | 2021 | Football | 1990-1993 | |
| Gordon, Jamon | 2021 | Basketball (M) | | |
| Harrison (Claye), Queen | 2021 | Track & Field | 2007-2010 | All-America (5th pl. 100M hurdles [OD]), 2007; All-America (3rd pl. 400M hurdles [OD]), 2007; All-America (3rd pl. 60M hurdles [ID]), 2008; National Champion/All-America (1st pl. 60M hurdles [ID]), 2010; National Champion/All-America - (1st pl. 100M hurdles [OD]), 2010; National Champion/All-America (1st pl. 400M hurdles [OD]), 2010 |
| Harris, Macho | 2021 | Football | 2005-2008 | All-America (1st team), 2008 |
| Arians, Bruce | 2022 | Football | 1971-1974 | |
| Chancellor, Kam | 2022 | Football | | |
| Gentry, Mike | 2022 | Strength & Conditioning | | |
| Habazin, Dorotea | 2022 | Track & Field | | All-America, (4th pl. Hammer), 2009; National Champion//All-America (1st pl. Hammer), 2011 |
| Hall, Vince | 2022 | Football | | |
| Lomicky, Marcel | 2022 | Track and Field (M) | | All-America (8th, Weight Throw, Indoor 2009) National Champion/All-America (1st Hammer Throw, Outdoor 2009); All-America (?nd, Hammer Throw, Outdoor 2010; All-America (?nd, Weight Throw, Indoor 2011); All-America (?nd, Hammer Throw, Outdoor 2011); National Champion/All-America (1st, Weight Throw, Indoor 2012) |
| Smith, Sara | 2022 | Swimming (F) | | All-America (?nd pl. 100 free, 2007) All-America (HM, 50 Free, 2007); All-America (HM, 50 Free, 2008); All-America (HM, 200 Medley Relay, 2008); All-America (HM, 400 Medley Relay, 2008); All-America (HM, 50 Free, 2009); All-America (HM, 400 Free Relay, 2009) |
| Bowman, Bob | 2023 | Wrestling, Track & Field, Cross Country | 1956-60 | |
| Delaney, Malcolm | 2023 | Basketball (M) | 2007-11 | All-America (HM, 2010); All-America (HM, 2011) |
| Fuller, Kyle | 2023 | Football | 2010-13 | All-America (2nd Team, 2013) |
| Mason, Carrie | 2023 | Basketball (W) | 2002-2006 | |
| Reeves, Jazmine | 2023 | Soccer (W) | 2010-2013 | All-America (1st Team) |
| Wilson, David | 2023 | Football, Track & Field | 2009-11 | All-America (6th place triple jump), 2011; All-America Football (2nd team), 2011 |
| Ziegler, Alexander | 2023 | Track & Field | 2009-13 | All-America Weight Throw Indoor (3rd), 2010; All-America Hammer Throw Outdoor (2nd) 2010, All-American Indoor Weight Throw (3rd Place), 2011; National Champion Outdoor Hammer Throw, 2011; National Champion Outdoor Hammer Throw, 2012; National Champion Indoor Weight Throw, 2013; All-American Indoor Weight Throw (3rd place), 2013 |
| Artis-Gray, Jeff | 2024 | Track & Field | 2011-13 | All-America (13th pl, 4x100 [OD]), 2012; All-America (13th pl, long jump [OD]), 2012; All-America (12th pl, DM(400) [ID], 2013; All-America (7th pl, long jump [ID]), 2013; All-America (5th pl, long jump [OD]) 2013 |
| Bowker, Larsen | 2024 | Coach (Tennis) | 1979-1998 | |
| Brown, Duane | 2024 | Football | 2004-2007 | |
| Cianelli, Dave | 2024 | Coach (Track & Field, Cross Country) | 2001-2024 | |
| Pryor, Brittany | 2024 | Field (W) | 2006-2009 | All-America (7th pl, shot [I]), 2007; All-America (9th pl, shot [O]), 2007; All-America (7th pl, shot [I]), 2008; All-America (7th pl, hammer [I]), 2008; All-America (10th pl, hammer [O]), 2009; All-America (11th pl, shot [O]), 2009 |
| Savage, Heather | 2024 | Swimming (W) | 2010-2013 | All-America (7th pl, 100 fly) 2012; All-America (7th pl, 100 fly) 2012 |
| Shinholser, Logan | 2024 | Diving (M) | 2009-2013 | All-America (8th pl, platform) 2011; All-America (7th pl, 1m) 2012; All-America (5th pl, 3m) 2012; All-America (6th pl, platform) 2012; All-America HM (9th pl, platform) |
| Taylor, Tyrod | 2024 | Football | 2007-2010 | |
| Arnett, Kaylea | 2025 | Diving (W) | 2011–2015 | All-America (3rd pl, 1 meter), 2014; All-America (9th pl, 3 meter, 2014); All-America (6th pl, 3 meter), 2015 |
| Barker, Kevin | 2025 | Baseball | 1994–1996 | All-America (2nd team), 1996 |
| Carter, Devin | 2025 | Wrestling | 2010–2014 | All-America (5th pl, 133 lbs ), 2012; All-America (2nd pl, 141 lbs), 2014, All-America (3rd pl, 141 lbs), 2015 |
| Fuller, Kendall | 2025 | Football | 2013–2015 | All-America (2nd team), 2014 |
| Green, Erick | 2025 | Basketball (M) | 2009–2013 | All-America (3rd team AP), 2012-13 |
| Liddle Barbour, Courtney | 2025 | Softball | 2010–2013 | |
| Vincent, Scott | 2025 | Golf (M) | 2011–2015 | All-America (1st team), 2014 |
| Cheynet, Jerry | 2026 | Coach (Men's soccer, Women's soccer, Wrestling, Men's Golf) | 1974–2025 | |
| Martin, Chris | 2026 | Wrestling | 1996–2001 | All-America (4th pl, 165 lbs), 2000 |
| McGoldrick, Kylie | 2026 | Softball | 2012–2015 | |
| Olhovsky, Yavgeniy | 2026 | Track & Field (M) | 2007–2010 | All-America (5th pl, pole vault [ID]) 2007; All-America (2nd pl, pole vault [OD]) 2008; All-America (2nd pl, pole vault [ID]) 2009; All-America (4th pl, pole vault [OD]) 2009; All-America (4th pl, pole vault [ID]) 2010; All-America (8th pl, pole vault [OD]) 2010; All-America (8th pl, pole vault [ID]) 2011 |
| Schultze, Martina | 2026 | Track & Field (W) | 2012–2014 | All-America (7th pl, pole vault [ID]) 2012; All-America (3rd pl, pole vault [ID]) 2013; All-America (8th pl, pole vault [OD]) 2013; All-America (7th pl, pole vault [ID]) 2014; All-America (3rd pl, pole vault [OD]) 2014 |
| Thomas, Logan | 2026 | Football | 2009–2013 | |
| Tiernan, Murielle | 2026 | Soccer (W) | 2013–2016 | All-America (3rd team), 2015 |
