= Charles Moir =

American basketball coach (1930–2019)

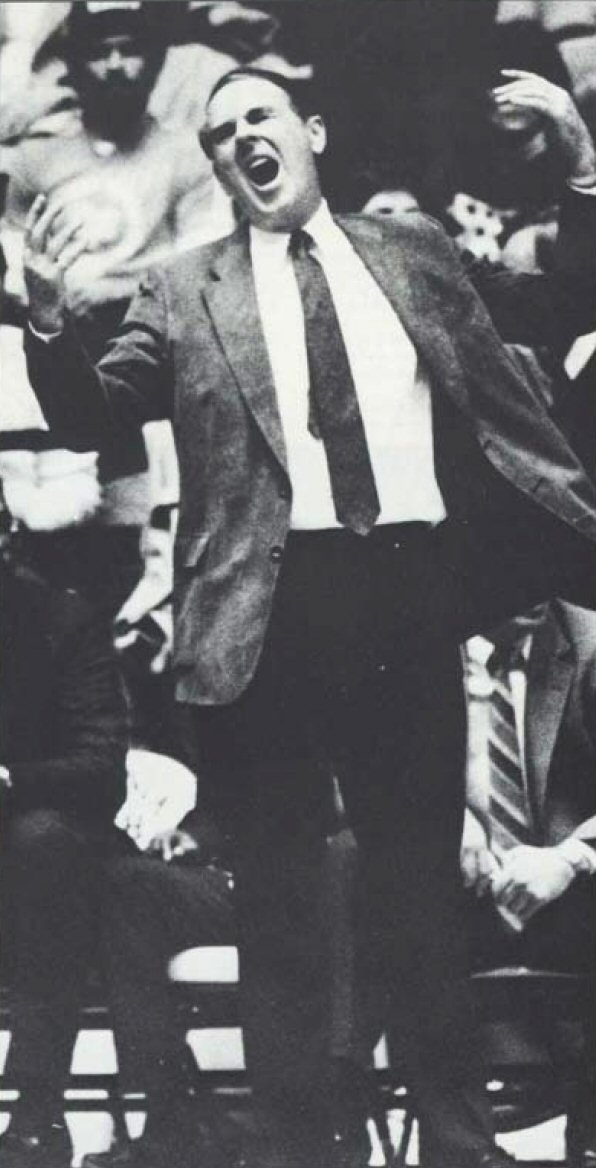
- Moir in 1987 as coach of Virginia Tech

Biographical details
- Born: November 29, 1930; Francisco, North Carolina, U.S.
- Died: November 14, 2019 (aged 88); Salem, Virginia, U.S.

Playing career
- 1949–1951: Appalachian State

Coaching career (HC unless noted)
- 1963–1967: Virginia Tech (assistant)
- 1967–1973: Roanoke
- 1973–1976: Tulane
- 1976–1987: Virginia Tech

Head coaching record
- Overall: 616–238

Accomplishments and honors

Championships
- NCAA Division II tournament (1972); Metro tournament (1979)

Charles Robert Moir (November 29, 1930 – November 14, 2019) was an American college basketball coach. He was the head coach of the Virginia Tech Hokies men's basketball team from 1976 until his resignation in October 1987. During his 11 seasons at Virginia Tech, Moir's Hokies compiled a 213–119 record. He was forced to resign after the discovery of severe NCAA violations. Including his time at Tech and coaching stints in high school and at Roanoke College and Tulane University, Moir compiled a career record of 616–238 in his 31 seasons as a high school and college head coach.

He was inducted into the Virginia Sports Hall of Fame (the state-wide organization that honors sports figures who were either from Virginia, or contributed to teams from the state) in 2000.

== College Athlete ==
Moir was a basketball and baseball athlete at Appalachian State University. Following his college career, Moir played Minor League Baseball with the Cincinnati Reds organization.

== College Coach ==
After three years in baseball, Moir moved on to coach high school basketball, coaching for eleven years in Stuart, Virginia, Jefferson, North Carolina, and Mount Airy, North Carolina and finishing with a career record of 224–43.

In 1963, Moir joined the Virginia Tech basketball coaching staff as an assistant. After coaching under Bill Matthews and Howard Shannon for four seasons, Moir moved on to Roanoke College where he compiled a 133–44 record in his six years, winning the NCAA College Division (now called Division II) national championship in 1972.

Moir's first recruit at Roanoke was Frankie Allen, the first African American basketball player in school history, who would eventually follow Moir as the head coach of Virginia Tech and become Virginia Tech's first African American head coach.

Moir left Roanoke for Tulane University in 1973, where he earned a 46–33 record. After three years in New Orleans, he returned to the Hokies and Virginia Tech.

=== Virginia Tech ===
Moir became the head coach in 1976, replacing Don DeVoe, who had moved on to Wyoming. In Moir's first season, the Hokies earned a bid to the NIT, but fell in the second round to #12 Alabama. In Moir's third season as coach, the Hokies, who had been independent since leaving the Southern Conference some 13 years earlier, joined the upstart Metro Conference. Tech stunned tournament favorite #13 Louisville in the conference semi-finals and went on to defeat Florida State for the conference championship.

Following Moir's lone losing season with the Hokies (1986–1987), a report presented by Mike Glazier and Michael Slive detailed 12 NCAA violations in Moir's program. The report found that, "in reviewing the academic records of basketball athletes, it is evident that most are not serious students." Most seriously, none of Moir's recruits from 1981 to 1986—essentially, what would be his last five recruiting classes—graduated. The most serious were that a player had falsely been given credit for a course he did not take and the wife of another player was given a personal car loan. Moir himself was cleared of any wrongdoing, but was forced to resign. Moir's ouster completed a difficult year for the Hokie program; athletics director and football coach Bill Dooley had been pushed out earlier that year. In October, Virginia Tech's football and basketball programs were placed on two years' probation, and the basketball team was banned from postseason play until the 1989–90 season. Virginia Tech was placed in the unenviable position of having both football and basketball on NCAA probation.

During his time at Tech, Moir led the Hokies to four NCAA tournament appearances and four NIT appearances. With a record of 213–119, Moir remains Tech's winningest basketball coach of all time and was inducted into the Virginia Tech Sports Hall of Fame in 2006.

== Personal ==
Moir's son, Page Moir, was the head men's basketball coach at Roanoke College in Salem, Virginia from 1989 to 2016. The younger Moir played for his father as a walk-on at Virginia Tech in the 1980s.

Charles Moir died on November 14, 2019, at age 88 of congestive heart failure.

== Head coaching record ==
=== College ===
Record table
Season	Team	Overall	Conference	Standing	Postseason
Roanoke Maroons (Mason–Dixon Conference) (1967–1973)
1967–68	Roanoke	22–8	11–3	1st	NCAA College Division Regional Fourth Place
1968–69	Roanoke	17–10	12–2		
1969–70	Roanoke	20–8	8–6		
1970–71	Roanoke	23–8	12–1		NCAA College Division Regional Fourth Place
1971–72	Roanoke	28–4	9–2		NCAA College Division champion
1972–73	Roanoke	23–6	10–2		NCAA College Division Quarterfinal
Roanoke:		133–44	62–16		
Tulane Green Wave (NCAA Division I independent) (1973–1976)
1973–74	Tulane	12–14			
1974–75	Tulane	16–10			
1975–76	Tulane	18–9			
Tulane:		46–33			
Virginia Tech Gobblers (NCAA Division I independent) (1976–1978)
1976–77	Virginia Tech	19–10			NIT Quarterfinal
1977–78	Virginia Tech	19–8			
Virginia Tech Gobblers/Hokies (Metro Conference) (1978–1987)
1978–79	Virginia Tech	22–9	4–6	T–4th	NCAA Division I Second Round
1979–80	Virginia Tech	21–8	8–4	2nd	NCAA Division I Second Round
1980–81	Virginia Tech	15–13	6–6	T–3rd	
1981–82	Virginia Tech	20–11	7–5	4th	NIT Quarterfinal
1982–83	Virginia Tech	23–11	7–5	T–2nd	NIT Second Round
1983–84	Virginia Tech	22–13	8–6	4th	NIT Semifinal
1984–85	Virginia Tech	20–9	10–4	2nd	NCAA Division I First Round
1985–86	Virginia Tech	22–9	7–5	3rd	NCAA Division I First Round
1986–87	Virginia Tech	10–18	5–7	T–5th	
Virginia Tech:		213–119	62–48		
Total:		392–196			
National champion Postseason invitational champion Conference regular season champion Conference regular season and conference tournament champion Division regular season champion Division regular season and conference tournament champion Conference tournament champion
