= Roger Strickland (basketball) =

American basketball player

Personal information
- Born: September 4, 1940 Jacksonville, Florida, U.S.
- Died: February 2, 2011 (aged 70) Jacksonville, Florida, U.S.
- Listed height: 6 ft 5 in (1.96 m)
- Listed weight: 200 lb (91 kg)

Career information
- High school: Bishop Kenny (Jacksonville, Florida)
- College: Jacksonville (1960–1963)
- NBA draft: 1963: 1st round, 7th overall pick
- Drafted by: Los Angeles Lakers
- Playing career: 1963–1964
- Position: Forward
- Number: 16

Career history
- 1963–1964: Baltimore Bullets

Career highlights
- Florida Intercollegiate Player of the Year (1962); 2× First-team All-Florida Intercollegiate (1962, 1963); No. 52 retired by Jacksonville Dolphins
- Stats at NBA.com
- Stats at Basketball Reference

Roger W. Strickland (September 4, 1940 – February 2, 2011), nicknamed "The Rifle", was an American basketball forward. He played college basketball for the Jacksonville Dolphins and professional basketball for the Baltimore Bullets of the National Basketball Association (NBA).

== Early years ==
Strickland was born in 1940 in Jacksonville, Florida. He attended Bishop Kenny High School where he was a standout baseball and basketball player.

== College career ==
After attending Notre Dame for a year, Strickland transferred to Jacksonville University where he continued to excel in baseball and basketball. He was selected by the Associated Press (AP) to the 1962 and 1963 college basketball Little All-America teams. He averaged 27 points per game at Jacksonville. He was also selected in 1962 and 1963 to the UPI's small college All-America basketball team.

Strickland also played baseball as a pitcher and outfielder at Jacksonville. In 1963 he was named the most valuable baseball player in the Florida Intercollegiate Conference. He was also selected as a second-team outfielder on the NAIA's 1963 All-America baseball team.

== Professional basketball ==
Strickland was taken with the eighth overall pick by the Los Angeles Lakers in the 1963 NBA draft; previously, in 1962, he was also drafted by the Boston Celtics. He signed with the Lakers in June 1963.

On September 25, 1963, the Lakers requested waivers on Strickland. On October 1, 1963, he was claimed off waivers by the Baltimore Bullets. He appeared in one game for the Bullets where he scored two points going 1-3 from the field.

== Later years ==
Strickland continued to play amateur basketball and was a member of the 1969 Samoa Lounge Headhunters club that competed for the national A.A.U. championship. He also became an executive with Southern Bell.

Strickland died in 2011 at age 70.

== Career statistics ==
Legend
GP	Games played	GS	Games started	MPG	Minutes per game
FG%	Field goal percentage	3P%	3-point field goal percentage	FT%	Free throw percentage
RPG	Rebounds per game	APG	Assists per game	SPG	Steals per game
BPG	Blocks per game	PPG	Points per game	**Bold**	Career high

=== NBA ===
==== Regular season ====
Year	Team	GP	MPG	FG%	FT%	RPG	APG	PPG
1963–64	Baltimore	1	4.0	.333	–	.0	.0	2.0
