= Ronnie Murphy =

American basketball player (born 1964)

Personal information
- Born: July 29, 1964 (age 62) Dover, Delaware, U.S.
- Listed height: 6 ft 5 in (1.96 m)
- Listed weight: 235 lb (107 kg)

Career information
- High school: Oviedo (Oviedo, Florida)
- College: Jacksonville (1983–1987)
- NBA draft: 1987: 1st round, 17th overall pick
- Drafted by: Portland Trail Blazers
- Playing career: 1987–1988
- Position: Shooting guard
- Number: 34

Career history
- 1987–1988: Portland Trail Blazers
- 1991: Jacksonville Hooters

Career highlights
- 2× First-team All-Sun Belt (1984, 1987); Second-team All-Sun Belt (1986); Sun Belt Freshman of the Year (1984)

Career NBA statistics
- Points: 36 (2.0 ppg)
- Rebounds: 11 (0.6 rpg)
- Assists: 6 (0.3 apg)
- Stats at NBA.com
- Stats at Basketball Reference

Ronald T. Murphy (born July 29, 1964) is an American former professional basketball player. Born in Dover, Delaware, Murphy played one season in the National Basketball Association (NBA) for the Portland Trail Blazers. He was drafted by Portland in the first round (17^{th} overall) of the 1987 NBA draft out of Jacksonville University, where he played for four years. Listed at 6 feet 5 inches (1.96 m) and 235 pounds (107 kg)^{[a]}, Murphy played one season in the NBA (1987–88) as a guard-forward appearing in a total of 18 games with an average of 2.0 points 0.6 rebounds per game. His rookie season ended after he fractured his fifth metatarsal bone during a practice in March 1988.

Murphy was suspended by the Trail Blazers before the 1988–89 season for not maintaining a proper weight. Murphy had been suspended the prior season for the same reason. Portland waived Murphy in December 1988 after he spent more than a month on the suspended list. Through his agent, Murphy accused the Trail Blazers of waiving him while he was recovering from an injury, which was against NBA rules. Portland settled the dispute with Murphy, who never played in the NBA subsequently. In 1991, he attempted a comeback and played one season in the United States Basketball League.

== Early life ==
Murphy was born on July 29, 1964, in Dover, Delaware. He attended Oviedo High School in Oviedo, Florida, where he played basketball. During his freshman season, Murphy was promoted to the varsity basketball team after his brother, Bernard Murphy, was suspended from the team for rules violations. Ronnie Murphy's senior season at Oviedo was cut short when he was ruled ineligible to play because of two incomplete grades. Those grades were later removed from Murphy's records, which allowed him to meet the requirements for his athletic scholarship to Jacksonville University. His high school coach Dale Phillips told The Orlando Sentinel, "[Ronnie Murphy] is the greatest player I'll ever coach. [...] I just wish I had done a better job on him as far as his classroom work was concerned. I feel as if I may have let him down." Greg Robinson, the head coach of Lake Howell High School, told the Sentinel, "[Murphy] is the best I've ever seen in Central Florida."

Murphy joined the Jacksonville Dolphins men's basketball team during the 1983–84 season. He was named Sun Belt Conference Freshman of the Year at the conclusion of the season. During his first season, Murphy played and started in 26 games and averaged 17.9 points per game with 5.8 rebounds, 2.8 assists and 1.5 steals.

During his junior season, Murphy scored 19 points to help the Jacksonville Dolphins defeat the UAB Blazers, 70–69, for the Sun Belt Conference Championship on March 1, 1986, in Birmingham, Alabama. With their conference championship victory, Jacksonville earned a spot in the 1986 NCAA Division I men's basketball tournament. They were ranked in the eight seed and faced off against the Temple Owls, who were seeded ninth. Murphy scored 22 points in the Dolphins' 61–50 overtime loss, which eliminated them from the tournament.

=== Senior season (1986–87) ===
In his December 17, 1986, column for Florida Today, sportswriter Don Coble wrote of the Dolphin's 2–5 record to start the season, "What Jacksonville desperately needs most, Murphy can't give. He's not a leader — by example or style. It is a characteristic he has learned to accept, although his critics call his court antics one of Jacksonville's greatest weaknesses." Murphy explained his mindset, telling Coble, "I put a lot of pressure on myself [...] I don't show my emotions off the court. But on the court, I want to be prefect. I want to hit every shot. I want to win."

Jacksonville finished the 1986–87 season with a 19–11 record and finished with the second best record in the Sun Belt Conference, 11–3. During the conference tournament, Jacksonville was defeated by the Alabama-Birmingham Blazers in the semifinals round. The Dolphins were invited to the 1987 National Invitation Tournament at Madison Square Garden in New York City where they were defeated in the first round by the Vanderbilt Commodores.

Murphy led the Sun Belt Conference in points per game with 22.0. He was second in the league in total points (661), steals per game (2.3), total steals (70), three-point field goals (69) and field goals attempted 521.

== Portland Trail Blazers ==
=== 1987–88 season ===
Murphy was drafted by the Portland Trail Blazers as the 17^{th} pick in the first round of the 1987 NBA draft. Barry Cooper of The Orlando Sentinel wrote of Murphy, "Some scouts thought Murphy might be taken earlier, but rumors of that he had 'attitude' problems and concerns about his weight — 235 pounds — dogged him."

During his rookie season, Murphy admittedly showed up out of shape to the Trail Blazers training camp on October 4, 1987. He was listed at 235 pounds (107 kg)^{[a]}, but head coach Mike Schuler told Dwight Jaynes of The Oregonian that Murphy was "a few pounds over that". The next two days it was reported Murphy sat out of a scrimmage due to a sprained ankle, however, it was later reported that he was unable to practice with the team since he was not under contract. On October 9, Murphy signed a contract with Portland. Murphy's foot injury was later diagnosed as a "stress reaction". Team trainers had him swim and use an exercise bike to rehabilitate. Murphy began the season on the injured reserve list.

It was announced November 23, 1987, that Murphy had been suspended without pay by Portland for failing to undergo a weight loss program. The suspension had been in place since November 13, but head coach Mike Schuler said the announcement was delayed in hopes Murphy would take the program seriously. Team trainers suspected Murphy's weight, which was estimated at 240 pounds (110 kg), complicated the recovery of his injured foot. The day before his suspension was announced, Murphy insulted Schuler in front of the team in the locker room of the Memorial Coliseum after the Blazers' 120–110 victory over the Indiana Pacers. Following a Blazers game on November 24, Schuler told reporters "We drafted Ronnie Murphy to play. [...] We did not draft Ronnie Murphy to sit him out. He has not presented himself in shape and it's nobody's fault but Ronnie Murphy's. [...] He has an obligation as a pro basketball player. This isn't college. You can only talk to people so many times and say the same things."

Murphy was taken off the suspended list on December 6, 1987, and medically cleared to return to practice, despite staying on the injured reserve list. Schuler gave the press an update on Murphy on December 18 saying, "He has to improve his physical status. He has made progress, but he isn't there yet." Murphy made his NBA debut on December 20 against the San Antonio Spurs in Portland. He played two minutes and missed one attempted field goal and two attempted free throws in the Blazers' 148–126 victory. To make room on the roster for Murphy, Portland allowed forward Nikita Wilson to sign with an overseas club and the Blazers placed him on their suspended list.

Early in January 1988 it was reported that Portland's front office was looking to trade Murphy due to the glut of guards on their roster. Murphy scored his career high in points with 11 on January 13 against the Utah Jazz. When Portland guard Jim Paxson returned from injury on January 16, Murphy was moved to the third shooting guard on the Blazers' depth chart. Murphy gave an interview to in Dwight Jaynes of The Oregonian in late January in which he said, "[his] weight problem was blown out of proportion". Before the NBA trade deadline, David Kahn of The Oregonian reported that Portland offered Murphy to the San Antonio Spurs in exchange for Cadillac Anderson, but the trade was declined. Murphy fractured his fifth metatarsal bone during a one-on-one practice session with teammate Clyde Drexler at the Riverplace Athletic Club in Downtown Portland on March 21, 1988. He played a total of 18 games during the 1987–88 season with an average of 2.0 points per game with a .286 field goal percentage.

=== 1988–89 season ===
During the 1988 NBA expansion draft, Portland left Murphy unprotected, although he was not one of the 23 players selected. It was announced in the off-season before the 1988–89 season that Murphy was assigned to the Blazers rookie training camp at the Portland Community College Sylvania campus. Portland general manager Bucky Buckwalter told The Oregonian sportswriter Dwight Jaynes, "[Murphy's] career largely depends on what he does this summer." Blazers' head coach Mike Schuler met with Murphy and told him that the team wanted him down to 227 pounds (103 kg) before training camp. On July 18, the camp opened and within an hour of practice Murphy, who weighed in at 244 pounds (111 kg), was sidelined with a sore foot. After getting advice from team doctors, Murphy went to a Seattle, Washington based doctor for a second opinion, who recommended physical therapy. Murphy was placed on the Blazers' Summer League roster, but his foot injury kept him out of action.

By October 1988, Portland coaches noted a change in Murphy's attitude. Assistant coach Rick Adelman told Dwight Jaynes of The Oregonian, "I think [Murphy's] attitude is much better [...] He has done a good job. He has been very positive and very receptive." Head coach Mike Schuler noted Murphy was in better shape and praised his hard work. He was the team's starting point guard, in place of an injured Terry Porter, during their first preseason game on October 6 against the Detroit Pistons. Murphy's foot, which had troubled him his entire career, was injured again during the preseason. He played through the injury since he was competing for a back-up guard spot on Portland's regular season roster.

On November 3, 1988, the Trail Blazers announced they were suspending Murphy because he had failed to meet a goal body weight and body fat percentage the team had set for him during the off-season. The move freed up a roster spot that Portland immediately filled with free agent guard Danny Young. Sportswriter Dwight Jaynes asked general manager Bucky Buckwalter why the team did not just waive Murphy's contract, to which Buckwalter replied, "We have always liked his skills [...] He has made some progress. We want to give him every chance." Murphy's suspension meant the Trail Blazers did not have to pay his guaranteed salary for the season. Buckwalter denied that there was a financial motive behind Murphy's suspension. On November 23, while still under suspension, Murphy was allowed to practice with the team. He played only five minutes of a scrimmage game before being sidelined with an ankle injury.

Murphy was waived by the Trail Blazers on December 7, 1988. Former teammate Jerome Kersey spoke positively of Murphy, telling The Oregonian, "Honestly, I don't think we have a backup two-guard. [...] Ronnie could do that for us. He could have provided a spark off the bench. I'm quite sure someone will pick him up. He's a talented kid." Portland head coach Mike Schuler was less kind saying, "From what I've seen in the time he was with us, he didn't have enough overall skills." The Blazers were still responsible for paying Murphy guaranteed salary. He signed with the Cedar Rapids Silver Bullets of the Continental Basketball Association after clearing waivers.

After his first practice in Cedar Rapids, Murphy complained of pain in his foot. It was examined by a doctor who diagnosed him with a stress fracture on the fifth metatarsal on his right foot, the same one he injured the prior season. Murphy's agent John Phillips announced they were protesting Portland's waiver with the NBA since league rules prohibit waiving injured players. Trail Blazers president Harry Glickman denied any wrongdoing, but the team's physician, Dr. Robert Cook, told Oregonian sportswriter David Kahn that Murphy's injury in March 1987 may have never fully healed. Phillips also alleged Murphy was being paid under the table during his suspension, which was denied by Glickman who called the payments a contract advance. A total of $50,000 (equivalent to $136,114 in 2025) was paid to Murphy during the time it was reported he was suspended without pay.

On January 5, 1989, it was announced the Trail Blazers had entered negotiations with Murphy's agent John Phillips to end their dispute against the team. Murphy was no longer demanding reinstatement on Portland's roster and requested $25,000 (equivalent to $64,933 in 2025) in salary lost during his suspension in 1987. Portland's attorney Kenneth E. Roberts told Phillips that the team would pay for Murphy's medical expenses. He underwent surgery on his foot, which doctors estimated would keep Murphy sidelined for four to six months.

== Later life ==
After his foot surgery, Murphy's weight increased to as much as 300 pounds (140 kg). He was a patient at the Baker International Wellness Clinic at Amelia Island Plantation in Florida where he lost nearly 50 pounds (23 kg) in five weeks. Eventually, Murphy gained the weight back and attempted a comeback through the United States Basketball League in 1991. He started the season at 280 pounds (130 kg), but lost 20 pounds (9.1 kg) over the duration of the season. He averaged 4.7 points per game and 1.6 rebounds per game with a .400 three point percentage as backup guard for the Jacksonville Hooters. Reflecting on his career in 1991, Murphy told Tim Povtak of the Orlando Sentinel, "People all the time say, 'If I had your chance, I wouldn't have let it slip away.' Well, they don't understand [...] Just because you're a first-round draft pick, there's nothing automatic."

Dee Brown, Murphy's teammate at Jacksonville University, reflected on his career in 1990 by saying, "[NBA teams are] paying you all that money and they should know how you tick. Ronnie Murphy was a great player, but everybody found out how he ticked. I thought he would be drafted high, but I didn't know how long he'd last in the league because of his attitude."

Murphy was the assistant coach for the Stevenson University Mustangs men's basketball team during the 2007–08 season.

Murphy's daughter, Amanda, competed in weight throw and hammer throw for the South Carolina Gamecocks women's track and field from 2018 to 2020. His son, Ben, walked-on to the Maryland Terrapins men's basketball team in 2023 after transferring from Howard Community College.

In 2019, Murphy was inducted into the Jacksonville University Athletic Hall of Fame.

== Career statistics ==
Legend
GP	Games played	GS	Games started	MPG	Minutes per game
FG%	Field goal percentage	3P%	3-point field goal percentage	FT%	Free throw percentage
RPG	Rebounds per game	APG	Assists per game	SPG	Steals per game
BPG	Blocks per game	PPG	Points per game	**Bold**	Career high

=== College ===
Year	Team	GP	GS	MPG	FG%	3P%	FT%	RPG	APG	SPG	BPG	PPG
1983–84	Jacksonville	26	26	**38.9**	**.478**	—	.760	**5.8**	2.8	1.5	**0.8**	17.9
1984–85	Jacksonville	28	27	30.3	.413	—	.690	3.3	2.7	1.3	0.5	12.9
1985–86	Jacksonville	**30**	**29**	33.5	.448	—	.702	4.3	**5.0**	2.0	0.6	15.0
1986–87	Jacksonville	**30**	—	33.5	.466	**.476**	**.791**	5.6	3.6	**2.3**	**0.8**	**22.0**
Career		114	—	33.9	.453	—	.740	4.8	3.6	1.8	0.7	17.2

=== NBA ===
Year	Team	GP	GS	MPG	FG%	3P%	FT%	RPG	APG	SPG	BPG	PPG
1987–88	Portland	18	0	4.9	.286	.250	.636	0.6	0.3	0.3	0.1	2.0

== Footnotes ==
- ^{a} Murphy's listed weight was 235 pounds (107 kg) according to The Oregonian in 1987, however, Basketball-Reference.com lists his weight at 225 pounds (102 kg).
