= Ken Barefoot =

American football player (born 1945)

No. 81
- Position: Tight end

Personal information
- Born: October 11, 1945 (age 81); Portsmouth, Virginia, U.S.
- Listed height: 6 ft 4 in (1.93 m)
- Listed weight: 230 lb (104 kg)

Career information
- High school: Great Bridge (Chesapeake, Virginia)
- College: Virginia Tech
- NFL draft: 1968: 5th round, 113th overall pick

Career history
- Washington Redskins (1968–1969)
- Stats at Pro Football Reference

Kenneth David Barefoot (born October 11, 1945) is an American former professional football player who was a tight end in the National Football League (NFL) for the Washington Redskins and the Detroit Lions. In 1999, he was inducted into the Virginia Tech Sports Hall of Fame.

== College career ==
Barefoot played college football for the Virginia Tech Hokies, and became the starting tight end mid-season in 1965. He led the team in receptions during the 1966 and 1967 seasons. As a senior, he stood 6 ft 4 in (1.93 m) and weighed 225 pounds (102 kg).

The Hokies earned a trip to the 1968 Liberty Bowl. He was selected to play for the East in the 43rd East–West Shrine Bowl in San Francisco under Coach Ara Parseghian and for the South in the 19th Senior Bowl in Mobile, Alabama under Coach Hank Stram. He held the record for most touchdown receptions by a tight end at Virginia Tech for over 35 years.

== Professional career ==
Barefoot was selected by the Washington Redskins as their fourth pick in the fifth round of the 1968 NFL/AFL draft where he was coached by Otto Graham and Vince Lombardi.

== Accolades ==
Barefoot was inducted into the Virginia Tech Sports Hall of Fame in 1999.

== Personal life ==
Barefoot married Kathleen Smith in 1966 and lives in Virginia Beach, Virginia. Both of his daughters (Jenifer Barefoot and Kati Barefoot Robins) graduated from Virginia Tech and his two sons (Jason Barefoot and Kenny Barefoot) played football at Virginia Tech under Coach Frank Beamer.
