= Singh Guram =

Indian basketball player

Personal information
- Born: India
- Listed height: 6 ft 7 in (2.01 m)

Career information
- High school: Airport (West Columbia, South Carolina, U.S.)
- College: Jacksonville (1978–1982)
- NBA draft: 1982: undrafted
- Position: Forward

Singh Guram is an Indian former basketball player. He played for the Jacksonville Dolphins from 1978 to 1982 as the first college basketball player from India.

== Early life ==
Guram was raised in India and did not know about basketball while growing up. His family moved to the United States in 1970 when his father accepted a teaching post at Voorhees College in Denmark, South Carolina, and there he was first introduced to basketball.

Guram attended Airport High School where he played on the basketball team. He averaged a team-high 21.3 points and 16 rebounds per game during his senior season. In addition, his 5 assists per game made Airport head coach Bob Novinger describe Guram's passing as his greatest asset. Guram left Airport as its all-time leading scorer and rebounder.

== College career ==
After first being linked to join The Citadel Bulldogs, Guram was recruited to play college basketball for the Jacksonville Dolphins in 1978. He became the first native of India to sign an athletic scholarship; he was also the first Indian to compete in college basketball in the United States. The Dolphins qualified for the 1979 NCAA Division I tournament during Guram's freshman season. Guram was the Dolphins' second-leading rebounder during his senior season in 1981–82. He averaged 4.7 points and 3.9 rebounds per game during his career with the Dolphins from 1978 to 1982.
