= 1978–79 Louisville Cardinals men's basketball team =

American college basketball season

1978–79 Louisville Cardinals men's basketball

Metro Conference Champions

NCAA Men's Division I Tournament, Sweet Sixteen
- Conference: Metro Conference (1975–1995)

Ranking
- Coaches: No. 19
- AP: No. 13
- Record: 24–8 (9–1 Metro)
- Head coach: Denny Crum (8th season)
- Assistant coaches: Bill Olsen; Wade Houston; Jerry Jones
- Home arena: Freedom Hall

1978–79 Metro Conference men's basketball standings
	Conf.				Overall
Team	W		L	PCT	W		L	PCT
No. 13 Louisville	9	–	1	.900	24	–	8	.750
Florida State	7	–	3	.700	19	–	10	.655
Memphis State	5	–	5	.500	13	–	15	.464
Virginia Tech †	4	–	6	.400	22	–	9	.710
Cincinnati	4	–	6	.400	13	–	14	.481
Saint Louis	3	–	7	.300	10	–	17	.370
Tulane	2	–	8	.200	8	–	19	.296
† 1979 Metro Conference tournament winner Rankings from AP Poll

The 1978–79 Louisville Cardinals men's basketball team represented the University of Louisville during the 1978–79 NCAA Division I men's basketball season, Louisville's 65th season of intercollegiate competition. The Cardinals competed in the Metro Conference and were coached by Denny Crum. The team played home games at Freedom Hall.

The team completed a 24–8 record and reached the Sweet Sixteen of the 1979 NCAA Tournament.

== Roster ==
1978–79 Louisville Cardinals men's basketball team
Players
Coaches

Pos.	#	Name	Height	Weight	Year	Previous school	Hometown
G	5	Jerry Eaves	6 ft 4 in (1.93 m)	180 lb (82 kg)	Fr	Ballard	Louisville, Kentucky
G	15	Greg Deuser	6 ft 0 in (1.83 m)	170 lb (77 kg)	Fr	Floyd Central	New Albany, Indiana
F	21	Scooter McCray	6 ft 8 in (2.03 m)	185 lb (84 kg)	Fr	Mount Vernon	Mount Vernon, New York
G	23	Tony Branch	6 ft 0 in (1.83 m)	175 lb (79 kg)	Jr	Elston	Michigan City, Indiana
F	24	Daryl Cleveland	6 ft 7 in (2.01 m)	190 lb (86 kg)	So	Thomas County Central	Thomasville, Georgia
G	34	Roger Burkman	6 ft 5 in (1.96 m)	175 lb (79 kg)	So	Franklin Central	Indianapolis, Indiana
G	35	Darrell Griffith	6 ft 4 in (1.93 m)	190 lb (86 kg)	Jr	Louisville Male	Louisville, Kentucky
C	40	Marty Pulliam	6 ft 9 in (2.06 m)	225 lb (102 kg)	Fr	Mercer Country Senior	Harrodsburg, Kentucky
C	41	Wiley Brown	6 ft 8 in (2.03 m)	220 lb (100 kg)	Fr	Worth County	Sylvester, Georgia
F	43	Derek Smith	6 ft 6 in (1.98 m)	205 lb (93 kg)	Fr	Hogansville	Hogansville, Georgia
G/F	44	Poncho Wright	6 ft 5 in (1.96 m)	195 lb (88 kg)	Fr	Marshall	Indianapolis, Indiana

Head coach

- Denny Crum (UCLA)

Assistant coach(es)

- Jerry Jones
- Bill Olsen
- Wade Houston

Legend

- (C) Team captain
- (S) Suspended
- (I) Ineligible
- (W) Walk-on
- Injured
- Current redshirt

== Schedule ==
Date time, TV	Rank^{#}	Opponent^{#}	Result	Record	Site city, state
Regular season
Nov 24, 1978*	No. 4	vs. Penn State; Sea Wolf Classic	W 89–58	1–0	Buckner Fieldhouse; Fort Richardson, Alaska
Nov 25, 1978*	No. 4	vs. Lamar; Sea Wolf Classic	W 90–68	2–0	Buckner Fieldhouse; Fort Richardson, Alaska
Nov 26, 1978*	No. 4	vs. No. 12 NC State; Sea Wolf Classic	L 66–72	2–1	Buckner Fieldhouse; Fort Richardson, Alaska
Dec 2, 1978*	No. 5	Tennessee	W 82–61	3–1	Freedom Hall; Louisville, Kentucky
Dec 6, 1978*	No. 7	No. 6 Michigan	W 86–84	4–1	Freedom Hall; Louisville, Kentucky
Dec 9, 1978*	No. 7	Idaho	W 101–54	5–1	Freedom Hall; Louisville, Kentucky
Dec 12, 1978*	No. 4	at Ohio State	L 69–85	5–2	St. John Arena; Columbus, Ohio
Dec 16, 1978*	No. 4	West Virginia	W 106–60	6–2	Freedom Hall; Louisville, Kentucky
Dec 23, 1978*	No. 12	Providence	W 88–70	7–2	Freedom Hall; Louisville, Kentucky
Dec 28, 1978*	No. 10	Wisconsin; Louisville Holiday Classic	W 70–53	8–2	Freedom Hall; Louisville, Kentucky
Dec 29, 1978*	No. 10	Mississippi State; Louisville Holiday Classic	L 73–80	8–3	Freedom Hall; Louisville, Kentucky
Jan 4, 1979*	No. 16	Chattanooga	W 94–70	9–3	Freedom Hall; Louisville, Kentucky
Jan 6, 1979*	No. 16	Louisiana-Lafayette	W 73–60	10–3	Freedom Hall; Louisville, Kentucky
Jan 8, 1979*	No. 16	Marshall	W 112–64	11–3	Freedom Hall; Louisville, Kentucky
Jan 13, 1979*	No. 12	at Maryland	W 99–84	12–3	Cole Fieldhouse; College Park, Maryland
Jan 16, 1979*	No. 7	at Dayton	W 77–76	13–3	UD Arena; Dayton, Ohio
Jan 18, 1979	No. 7	at Cincinnati; Rivalry	W 82–77	14–3 (1–0)	Riverfront Coliseum; Cincinnati, Ohio
Jan 20, 1979	No. 7	at Florida State	W 67–65	15–3 (2–0)	Tully Gymnasium; Tallahassee, Florida
Jan 24, 1979	No. 5	Saint Louis	W 80–65	16–3 (3–0)	Freedom Hall; Louisville, Kentucky
Jan 28, 1979	No. 5	Virginia Tech	W 82–72	17–3 (4–0)	Freedom Hall; Louisville, Kentucky
Jan 31, 1979	No. 6	Florida State	W 84–71	18–3 (5–0)	Freedom Hall; Louisville, Kentucky
Feb 3, 1979	No. 6	Cincinnati; Rivalry	W 88–85	19–3 (6–0)	Freedom Hall; Louisville, Kentucky
Feb 5, 1979	No. 6	Memphis State; Rivalry	W 103–82	20–3 (7–0)	Freedom Hall; Louisville, Kentucky
Feb 8, 1979	No. 5	at Tulane	W 77–66	21–3 (8–0)	Avron B. Fogelman Arena; New Orleans, Louisiana
Feb 10, 1979*	No. 5	at No. 9 Marquette	L 55–71	21–4	MECCA Arena; Milwaukee, Wisconsin
Feb 15, 1979	No. 9	at Saint Louis	W 78–62	22–4 (9–0)	St. Louis Arena; St. Louis, Missouri
Feb 17, 1979*	No. 9	at Memphis State; Rivalry	L 53–60	22–5 (9–1)	Mid-South Coliseum; Memphis, Tennessee
Feb 18, 1979*	No. 9	at No. 5 Duke	L 72–88	22–6	Charlotte Coliseum; Charlotte, North Carolina
Feb 24, 1979	No. 13	Tulane	W 95–71	23–6 (10–1)	Freedom Hall; Louisville, KY
Metro Conference Tournament
Mar 2, 1979*	(1) No. 13	vs. (4) Virginia Tech; Metro Tournament Semifinal	L 68–72	23–7	Mid-South Coliseum; Memphis, Tennessee
NCAA Tournament
Mar 10, 1979*	(3 MW) No. 18	vs. (6 MW) South Alabama; Second round	W 69–66	24–7	Moody Coliseum; University Park, Texas
Mar 15, 1979*	(3 MW) No. 13	vs. (2 MW) No. 5 Arkansas; Regional semifinal	L 62–73	24–8	Riverfront Coliseum; Cincinnati, Ohio
*Non-conference game. ^{#}Rankings from AP. (#) Tournament seedings in parentheses. MW=Midwest. All times are in Eastern.

== Team players drafted into the NBA ==
Year	Round	Pick	Player	NBA club
1980	1	2	Darrell Griffith	Utah Jazz
1982	2	35	Derek Smith	Golden State Warriors
1983	2	36	Scooter McCray	Seattle SuperSonics
