= Bob Schweickert =

American football player (born 1942)

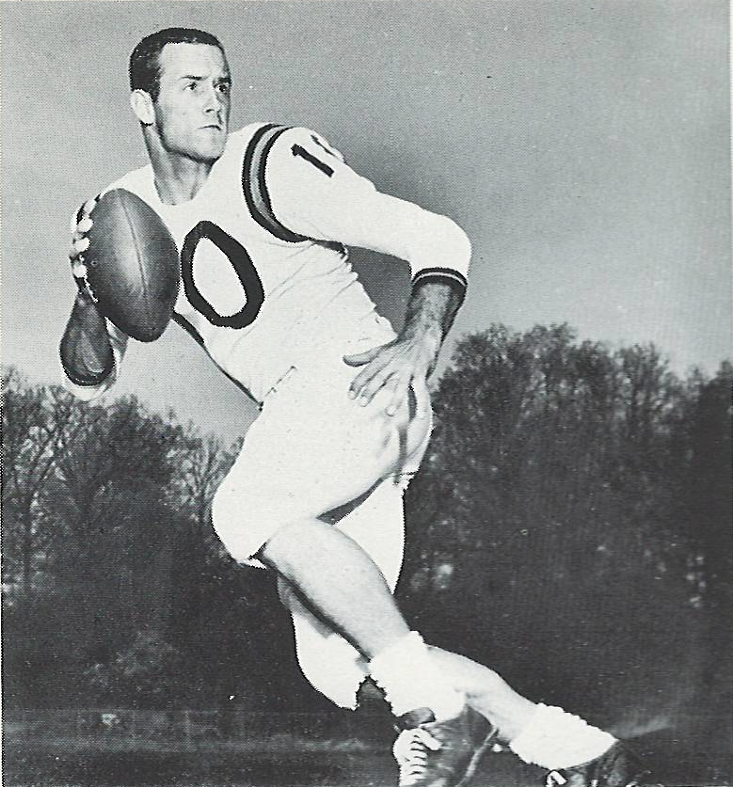
- Schweickert, c. 1964

No. 20, 35
- Position: Quarterback

Personal information
- Born: September 17, 1942 (age 84); Bon Air, Virginia, U.S.
- Listed height: 6 ft 1 in (1.85 m)
- Listed weight: 190 lb (86 kg)

Career information
- High school: Midlothian (Midlothian, Virginia)
- College: Virginia Tech (1961-1964)
- NFL draft: 1965: 3rd round, 29th overall pick
- AFL draft: 1965: 4th round, 28th overall pick

Career history
- New York Jets (1965); Jersey Jets (1966); New York Jets (1967)

Awards and highlights
- First-team All-American (1964); Third-team All-American (1963); 2× SoCon Media Player of the Year (1963–64); Virginia Tech Sports Hall of Fame (1983)
- Stats at Pro Football Reference

Robert Lynn Schweickert (born September 17, 1942) is an American former professional football player who was a quarterback for the New York Jets of the American Football League (AFL). Schweickert played college football for the Virginia Tech Hokies, leading the program to its only Southern Conference championship in 1963. He was a first-team All-America for the Hokies in 1964. (At the time Virginia Tech was primarily referred to as the VPI Gobblers). He was two-time Southern Conference Media player of the year. He saw action in two seasons of professional football with the Jets.

== Early life ==
Schweickertwas born in the town of Bon Air in Chesterfield County, Virginia. He attended Midlothian High School in Midlothian, Virginia.

== College career ==
=== 1962 season ===
After suffering a shoulder injury in preseason, Schweickert played in the last six games at quarterback for coach Jerry Claiborne's Gobblers in his sophomore season (1962), and led the team in touchdowns with five. He had 51 rushing attempts for 308 yards, averaging a team-high 6.0 yards per carry. He threw only 41 times in VPI’s run-centered offense, but had three touchdown passes. His quarterback rating was 97.9 as VPI sported a 5-5 record.

=== 1963 season ===
Schweickert led the Hokies to its first and only Southern Conference championship in 1963 as the team sported an 8-2 record, and was 5-0 in conference play. (At the time, the Southern Conference had eight other members, including West Virginia, Furman, VMI, William & Mary, Richmond, The Citadel, Davidson, and George Washington). The dual-threat quarterback, who also was the team's punter, led the conference in rushing yards (839), total offense (1526), and total touchdowns (13; 7 rushing/6 passing). He completed 53.4 percent of his 116 attempts, and had a quarterback rating of 106.5. He was third-team Associated Press All-America in 1963, and named Southern Conference Media Player of the Year.

=== 1964 season ===
Schweickert garnered first-team All-America honors for the Football Writers of America Association in 1964. Tech was 6-4, with a 3-1 conference record in 1964, losing to Southern Conference champion West Virginia. Schweickert handed off to backfield mate Sonny Utz more often in ’64 than he ran himself, but still had 576 yards on 131 attempts, with nine scores on the ground. He also had nine passing touchdowns, and 833 yards passing and a sterling 133.6 passer rating. He led the Southern Conference with 1409 total yards and 18 total touchdowns for which he was responsible (passing plus rushing). He was named Southern Conference Media Player of the Year for the second time.

=== College summary ===
At the end of the 2018 season, Schweickert still held the record for the longest run from scrimmage for the Hokies with a 96-yard jaunt against Wake Forest in the 1962 season. He scored on six touchdown runs of over 50 yards in his career. He also had the seventh longest punt return in Tech history with an 82-yard return against VMI in ’63. During his career, the quarterback had six 100+ yard games, including 204 yards versus Richmond in 1963. He was also the team’s punter during the ’63 and ’64 seasons. Schweickert completed his career with 1,723 rushing yards and 21 rushing touchdowns. He averaged 5.1 yards per carry. As a passer, he had 1,725 yards and 18 touchdowns. His quarterback rating was 116.3.

== Professional career ==
Schweickert was the 29th overall pick by the San Francisco 49ers in the third round of the 1965 NFL draft. He opted to play with the New York Jets who picked him 28th in 1965 American Football League draft. He appeared in a total of six games for the Jets, three in both 1965 and 1967.

== Honors ==
Schweickert was elected to the Virginia Tech Sports Hall of Fame in 1983.
