= James Ray (basketball) =

American basketball player (1957–2023)

Personal information
- Born: July 27, 1957 New Orleans, Louisiana, U.S.
- Died: December 26, 2023 (aged 66) Gainesville, Florida, U.S.
- Listed height: 6 ft 8 in (2.03 m)
- Listed weight: 215 lb (98 kg)

Career information
- High school: L. B. Landry (New Orleans, Louisiana)
- College: Jacksonville (1976–1980)
- NBA draft: 1980: 1st round, 5th overall pick
- Drafted by: Denver Nuggets
- Playing career: 1980–1987
- Position: Power forward
- Number: 43

Career history
- 1980–1983: Denver Nuggets
- 1983–1984: Berloni Torino
- 1985–1986: Peñas Huesca
- 1986–1987: Fenerbahçe

Career highlights
- Sun Belt Player of the Year (1980); 3× First-team All-Sun Belt (1978–1980); No. 43 retired by Jacksonville Dolphins
- Stats at NBA.com
- Stats at Basketball Reference

James Earl Ray (July 27, 1957 – December 26, 2023) was an American professional basketball player. After playing college basketball for the Jacksonville Dolphins, he was selected fifth overall by the Denver Nuggets in the 1980 NBA draft. He subsequently played three seasons for the team, appearing in 103 games and finishing with career averages of 3.4 points and 2.2 rebounds per game. Moving to Europe, he went on to play professionally in Italy, Spain and Turkey.

== Post-career ==
In 2001, Ray was diagnosed with sarcoidosis. Due to his failing health and financial challenges, the NBA's retired players association provided him support. In 2008, Ray received a lung transplant, soon after receiving a diagnosis of having three months to live without one. The likelihood of receiving a transplant had been rated poorly, due to his need, at 6'9, of receiving lungs from a person taller than 6'5. He died on December 26, 2023, at the age of 66.

== Career statistics ==
Legend
GP	Games played	GS	Games started	MPG	Minutes per game
FG%	Field goal percentage	3P%	3-point field goal percentage	FT%	Free throw percentage
RPG	Rebounds per game	APG	Assists per game	SPG	Steals per game
BPG	Blocks per game	PPG	Points per game	**Bold**	Career high

=== NBA ===
==== Regular season ====
Year	Team	GP	GS	MPG	FG%	3P%	FT%	RPG	APG	SPG	BPG	PPG
1980–81	Denver	18		8.2	.306	.000	**.700**	2.1	.6	.2	.2	2.1
1981–82	Denver	40	**4**	6.6	.440	**1.000**	.583	1.6	.7	.3	**.4**	3.1
1982–83	Denver	**45**	3	**9.6**	**.458**	.000	.647	**2.8**	**.9**	**.5**	**.4**	**3.8**
Career		103	7	8.2	.428	.333	.629	2.2	.7	.4	.4	3.2

==== Playoffs ====
Year	Team	GP	MPG	FG%	3P%	FT%	RPG	APG	SPG	BPG	PPG
1982	Denver	1	2.0	–	–	–	.0	.0	.0	**1.0**	.0
1983	Denver	**3**	**6.0**	**.167**	–	**.250**	**1.0**	.0	.0	.3	**1.0**
Career		4	5.0	.167	–	.250	.8	.0	.0	.5	.8
