= 1978–79 Utah State Aggies men's basketball team =

American college basketball season

1978–79 Utah State Aggies men's basketball

Pacific Coast Athletic Association Regular season champion

NCAA tournament, First Round
- Conference: Pacific Coast Athletic Association
- Record: 19–11 (9–5 PCAA)
- Head coach: Dutch Belnap
- Home arena: Dee Glen Smith Spectrum

1978–79 Pacific Coast Athletic Association men's basketball standings
	Conf.				Overall
Team	W		L	PCT	W		L	PCT
Pacific †	11	–	3	.786	18	–	12	.600
Utah State	9	–	5	.643	19	–	11	.633
Fresno State	9	–	5	.643	16	–	12	.571
Cal State Fullerton	7	–	7	.500	16	–	11	.593
Long Beach State	7	–	7	.500	16	–	12	.571
UC Santa Barbara (Note: UC Santa Barbara was forced to vacated all wins during the 1978–79 season due to the use of ineligible players. UC Santa Barbara Record Book still includes win and loss totals.)	6	–	8	.429	12	–	15	.444
San Jose State	4	–	10	.286	7	–	20	.259
UC Irvine (Note: Two losses against UC Santa Barbara included in win count per UC Irvine Record Book.)	3	–	11	.214	9	–	19	.321
† 1979 PCAA tournament winner Rankings from AP Poll

The 1978–79 Utah State Aggies men's basketball team represented Utah State University as a member of the Pacific Coast Athletic Association during the 1978–79 men's college basketball season. The Aggies were led by head coach Dutch Belnap and played their home games at the Dee Glen Smith Spectrum in Logan, Utah. After finishing second in the conference regular season standings, Utah State received an at-large bid to the NCAA Tournament where they lost in the first round to Southern California.

== Roster ==
1978–79 Utah State Aggies men's basketball team
Players
Coaches

Pos.	#	Name	Height	Weight	Year	Hometown
G	10	Keith McDonald	6 ft 3 in (1.91 m)	190 lb (86 kg)	Sr	Oakland, California
F	30	Dean Hunger	6 ft 8 in (2.03 m)	215 lb (98 kg)	Jr	Kaysville, Utah

Head coach

- Dutch Belnap

Assistant coach(es)

Legend

- (C) Team captain
- (S) Suspended
- (I) Ineligible
- (W) Walk-on
- Injured
- Current redshirt

== Schedule and results ==
Date time, TV	Rank^{#}	Opponent^{#}	Result	Record	Site city, state
Regular season
Nov 28, 1978*		at Utah	L 81–84	0–1	Jon M. Huntsman Center; Salt Lake City, Utah
Dec 1, 1978*		vs. Iona; Carrier Classic	L 61–73	0–2	Manley Field House; Syracuse, New York
Dec 2, 1978*		vs. Western Michigan; Carrier Classic	W 93–85	1–2	Manley Field House; Syracuse, New York
Dec 6, 1978*		at Brigham Young	L 80–99	1–3	Marriott Center; Provo, Utah
Dec 9, 1978*		Boise State	W 84–75	2–3	Dee Glen Smith Spectrum; Logan, Utah
Dec 11, 1978*		Colorado	W 91–70	3–3	Dee Glen Smith Spectrum; Logan, Utah
Dec 16, 1978*		at Weber State	W 76–70	4–3	Dee Events Center; Ogden, Utah
Dec 18, 1978*		Portland State	W 94–68	5–3	Dee Glen Smith Spectrum; Logan, Utah
Dec 23, 1978*		Weber State	L 64–73	5–4	Dee Glen Smith Spectrum; Logan, Utah
Jan 3, 1979*		Utah	W 80–72	6–4	Dee Glen Smith Spectrum; Logan, Utah
Jan 6, 1979*		BYU	W 84–68	7–4	Dee Glen Smith Spectrum; Logan, Utah
Jan 9, 1979		Fresno State	W 56–49	8–4 (1–0)	Dee Glen Smith Spectrum; Logan, Utah
Jan 11, 1979		at Pacific	L 82–86	8–5 (1–1)	Pacific Pavilion; Stockton, California
PCAA tournament
Mar 1, 1979*		vs. San Jose State; Quarterfinals	W 85–78	18–9	Anaheim Convention Center; Anaheim, California
Mar 2, 1979*		vs. Fresno State; Semifinals	W 81–74	19–9	Anaheim Convention Center; Anaheim, California
Mar 3, 1979*		vs. Pacific; Championship game	L 73–82	19–10	Anaheim Convention Center; Anaheim, California
NCAA Tournament
Mar 9, 1979*	(10 W)	vs. (7 W) Southern California; First round	L 67–86	19–11	Pauley Pavilion; Los Angeles, California
*Non-conference game. ^{#}Rankings from AP Poll. (#) Tournament seedings in parentheses. W=West.
