= 1978–79 Penn Quakers men's basketball team =

American college basketball season

1978–79 Penn Quakers men's basketball

Ivy League champions

NCAA tournament, Final Four
- Conference: Ivy League

Ranking
- AP: No. 14
- Record: 25–7 (13–1 Ivy)
- Head coach: Bob Weinhauer (2nd season)
- Home arena: The Palestra

1978–79 Ivy League men's basketball standings
	Conf.				Overall
Team	W		L	PCT	W		L	PCT
No. 14 Penn	13	–	1	.929	25	–	7	.781
Columbia	10	–	4	.714	17	–	9	.654
Princeton	7	–	7	.500	14	–	12	.538
Dartmouth	6	–	8	.429	14	–	12	.538
Brown	6	–	8	.429	8	–	18	.308
Harvard	6	–	8	.429	8	–	21	.276
Yale	5	–	9	.357	11	–	15	.423
Cornell	3	–	11	.214	8	–	18	.308
Rankings from AP Poll

The 1978–79 Penn Quakers men's basketball team was a college basketball team that represented the University of Pennsylvania in the 1978–79 NCAA Division I men's basketball season. The Quakers, coached by Bob Weinhauer, played in the Ivy League and had a 25–7 win–loss record. Penn won the Ivy League regular season championship for the eighth time in 10 years and participated in the 1979 NCAA Division I basketball tournament. There, as the ninth seed in the 10-team East region, the Quakers defeated Iona, number one seed North Carolina, Syracuse, and St. John's to reach the Final Four. In the national semifinals, they lost to a Michigan State team that included Magic Johnson, and an overtime loss in the third-place game against DePaul ended their season. The 1978–79 Quakers are the last Ivy League team to play in the Final Four.

== Background ==
During the previous decade, Penn had been highly ranked at times. In 1969–70, the Quakers lost only once in 26 regular season games and reached the top 10 in multiple national polls before a first-round loss in the NCAA tournament. The following season, the Quakers did not lose during the regular season and achieved a year-end ranking of number three, but were routed by Villanova in the regional finals of the NCAA tournament; in 1971–72 they ended the regular season second in the Associated Press (AP) Poll, and again lost in the regional finals. Penn won at least 17 games in each of the next four seasons, but was only able to advance out of the first round of the NCAA Tournament once, in 1973. Before the 1977–78 season, Bob Weinhauer became the Quakers' head coach, taking the job previously held by Chuck Daly. The Quakers qualified for the NCAA tournament and won one game before being eliminated by Duke, 84–80.

== Roster ==
Penn had four returning starters who were in their senior year at the school. Among them was 6'6" Tony Price, who became a leader for the team. The other senior starters were Tim Smith, Matthew White, and Bobby Willis. Price, a forward, topped the Quakers with averages of 19.8 points and 8.7 rebounds per game, and added 3.3 assists per game. Forward Smith had 13.4 points and 6.4 rebounds per game, and White, a center, averaged 11.7 points and 7.5 rebounds. Willis, a guard, contributed 9.1 points per game and led Penn with 4.2 assists per game. Other players for the Quakers included guard James Salters, who averaged 9.3 points per game, fellow guards Ken Hall and Angelo Reynolds, and forward Vincent Ross.

1978–79 Penn Quakers men's basketball team
Players
Coaches

Pos.	#	Name	Height	Weight	Year	Previous school	Hometown
G	3	James Salters	5 ft 11 in (1.8 m)	—	Jr	Malverne, New York
F	4	Ted Flick	6 ft 7 in (2.01 m)	—	So	Seabreeze High School	Daytona Beach, Florida
G	5	David Jackson	6 ft 3 in (1.91 m)	—	Fr
G	12	Angelo Reynolds	6 ft 2 in (1.88 m)	—	So	West Catholic	Philadelphia, Pennsylvania
C	14	Tom Condon	6 ft 9 in (2.06 m)	—	Fr
G/F	15	Tony Price (C)	6 ft 6 in (1.98 m)	190 lb (86 kg)	Sr	William Howard Taft	New York City, New York
F	20	Tim Smith	6 ft 5 in (1.96 m)	—	Sr	West Philadelphia High	Philadelphia, Pennsylvania
C	21	Matthew White	6 ft 10 in (2.08 m)	210 lb (95 kg)	Sr	Choate Rosemary Hall	New York City, New York
F	22	Vincent Ross	6 ft 8 in (2.03 m)	—	Fr	West Philadelphia High	Philadelphia, Pennsylvania
F	31	Ed Kuhl	6 ft 5 in (1.96 m)	—	Sr
G	32	Bobby Willis (C)	6 ft 2 in (1.88 m)	—	Sr	James Monroe	Bronx, New York
G	33	Ken Hall	6 ft 2 in (1.88 m)	—	So
F	40	Tom Leifsen	6 ft 9 in (2.06 m)	—	Fr

Head coach

- Bob Weinhauer

Assistant coach(es)

- Dennis Jackson
- Bob Staak

Legend

- (C) Team captain
- (S) Suspended
- (I) Ineligible
- (W) Walk-on
- Injured
- Current redshirt

== Regular season ==
The Quakers' non-conference schedule was described by writer Neal Geoghegan as "quite challenging". It included two games against Atlantic Coast Conference (ACC) opposition, and an invitation to the Cabrillo Classic tournament in San Diego, where the Quakers were matched with Big Ten Conference team Iowa. In addition, Penn participated in the annual Big 5 series against other Philadelphia colleges, having finished in at least a share of first place in the competition six times in the previous nine years.

Penn opened the season at their home arena, The Palestra, against the ACC's Virginia on November 29, 1978, winning by an 80–78 margin. Two days later, the Quakers traveled to Navy for their second game and posted an 82–66 victory. Another road game at Tulane followed, which the Quakers won by 17 points to move to 3–0. Following that game, Penn hosted La Salle, in their first Big 5 game of the season. In a close encounter, Price made a jump shot in the closing seconds to give the Quakers a 68–67 win. The Quakers then traveled to San Diego for their matchup with Iowa. The teams played into double overtime, where the Hawkeyes defeated the Quakers 87–84 to hand Penn their first loss of the season. In the consolation game of the Cabrillo Classic, the Quakers allowed San Diego State to score 110 points in a blowout loss.

On January 5, 1979, Penn began their Ivy League schedule with a game at Harvard. It was the first of five consecutive away games against Ivy League competition. The Quakers tallied 103 points in a win, which was followed the next day by a 52–44 triumph at Dartmouth. Penn then faced Temple, who were ranked 18th in the country at the time. Salters contributed 21 points, and Price had 19, in a 79–74 Quakers win. Princeton was the Quakers' next opponent; the Tigers were Penn's most formidable competition in the Ivy League. The Quakers were forced into overtime, but emerged with a one-point win. With a close 43–42 victory over Saint Joseph's, the Quakers guaranteed themselves at least a share of the Big 5 championship.

Following a 97–85 win against Richmond, the Quakers hosted a top-10 Georgetown team on January 20. The game was tightly contested in the closing minutes, but a score by Georgetown center Tommy Scates with 1:16 remaining gave the Hoyas a lead they held for the rest of the contest, as Penn lost by two points. Afterwards, the Quakers went on a four-game winning streak, defeating Brown, Yale, Columbia, and Cornell by double digits. By this point, the Quakers' record had improved to 15–3, and they remained undefeated in the Ivy League. The streak ended with an 89–80 loss to Villanova, which prevented Penn from sweeping its Big 5 games. Regardless, the Quakers finished tied for first in the series, giving them their seventh title in a decade. Four further wins against Ivy League teams, including another one-point win over Princeton, brought the Quakers' record to 19–4. By the time Penn suffered its first defeat in 12 conference games, against Columbia, the team had clinched the Ivy League title and become the first NCAA tournament qualifiers of the season. With home wins over Yale and Brown, the Quakers ended the regular season 13–1 in the Ivy League record and 21–5 mark overall.

== Postseason ==
In the NCAA Tournament, the Quakers were placed in the East region and given the number nine seed in that 10-team portion of the bracket. They were forced to play an opening round game on March 9 against first-time NCAA Tournament participant Iona. Behind a combined 28 points by Price and Willis, the Quakers jumped out to a 41–29 advantage at halftime, before an Iona rally in the second half brought the Gaels to within 57–55. Despite allowing the Gaels to cut their deficit to one point near the end of the second half, Penn did not relinquish their lead, holding on for a 73–69 win to advance to the second round. The result earned the Quakers a March 11 meeting with North Carolina, the number one seed in the East region and number three team in the country. Against coach Dean Smith's Tar Heels team, Price had 25 points and nine rebounds; he was one of four Quakers with at least 10 points. The Quakers gained the lead in the second half. Although the Tar Heels attempted a comeback, the Quakers managed a 72–71 victory.

Penn's opponent in the East region's semifinals was Syracuse, which had become the favorite to advance to the Final Four after North Carolina and Duke had been knocked out. The Quakers played what Geoghegan called their "best first half of the season", and were up by 13 points at halftime. Syracuse came within five points at one stage in the second half, but Penn was able to clinch an 84–76 win. Price had 20 points for the Quakers, while Smith added 18. St. John's, which had previously eliminated Duke and was the team that received the final NCAA Tournament invitation as a 10 seed, was the Quakers' opponent in the regional final. Price and Smith made all 10 of their second half field goal attempts to help bring Penn back from a deficit. The game was tied with 23 seconds to play, when Salters was fouled and made two free throws to give Penn the lead. St. John's missed three shots in an attempt to tie the score before fouling Price, who scored 21 points in the game. His free throw attempt was no good, but St. John's was unable to get a shot off before the time expired, as the Quakers won 64–62. They became the first Ivy League team since Princeton in 1965 to reach the Final Four, and the fourth overall.

The Quakers' imminent appearance at the Final Four in Salt Lake City sparked celebrations on the University of Pennsylvania campus, including a rally that drew almost 10,000 fans. However, the team encountered difficulties in their preparation, as their practice facility was being used to host an indoor tennis event. Penn faced Michigan State, which featured Magic Johnson. The Spartans took a commanding lead early; writer Stefan Fatsis said that they "missed what seemed like a hundred layups" as Michigan State took a 31–6 lead. At halftime, the score was 50–17. Michigan State ultimately won 101–67. Johnson led the Spartans in their victory over the Quakers with 29 points, as he made nine of his 10 shot attempts and 11 of his 12 free throws; his 10 rebounds and 10 assists gave him a triple-double. For Penn, Price was the leading scorer with 18 points.

The Quakers then played a third-place game against DePaul, in which Price scored 21 first-half points (of his 31 overall) that helped reduce an early 23-point deficit to 11 by halftime. They rallied further in the second half, and a Salters basket with 11 seconds remaining tied the score at 85–85 and eventually forced overtime. However, Mark Aguirre scored eight points for the Blue Demons in the extra period, and the Quakers fell 96–93. Four Penn players fouled out, tied for the most ever in a Final Four game, as the team's fouls led to 34 DePaul free throw attempts. The defeat made the Quakers' final record 25–7.

== Rankings ==
The Quakers were ranked 14th in the final AP Poll, having never entered the top 20 during the regular season. Penn did not make an appearance in the Coaches Poll in 1978–79.

== Aftermath and legacy ==
After being named the Ivy League Player of the Year for 1978–79, and scoring 23.7 points per game in the NCAA Tournament, Price was chosen by the Detroit Pistons in the 1979 NBA draft. In 1979–80, Penn had a 17–12 record, including an 11–3 mark in the Ivy League. The team again reached the NCAA tournament, but were knocked out in the second round. The following season, the Quakers won 20 games but did not make the tournament. Weinhauer coached one further season at Penn, in which St. John's defeated the Quakers in their first NCAA tournament game, before leaving the program for Arizona State.

As of 2019, the 1978–79 season is the only one in which the Quakers have reached the national semifinals in the NCAA Tournament. The program has advanced past the first round twice since then, in 1980 and 1994, and lost in the second round on both occasions. The 1978–79 Penn team was selected by USA Today in 2013 as the fourth most surprising Final Four participant. It was the first nine-seed in an NCAA Tournament to reach the Final Four, and no other team with the same seed advanced that far until 2013, when Wichita State did so. The 1978–79 Quakers were the last team from the Ivy League to play in the Final Four as of 2023, and no team from the conference advanced as far as the regional semifinals again until Cornell in 2010.
