= 1979 Southwest Conference men's basketball tournament =

- Classification: Division I
- Season: 1978–79
- Teams: 9
- Site: The Summit; Houston, Texas
- Champions: Arkansas (2nd title)
- Winning coach: Eddie Sutton (2nd title)
- MVP: Sidney Moncrief (Arkansas)
- Television: Metro Communications

1978–79 Southwest Conference men's basketball standings
	Conf.				Overall
Team	W		L	PCT	W		L	PCT
No. 5 Arkansas†	13	–	3	.813	25	–	5	.833
Texas	13	–	3	.813	21	–	8	.724
Texas A&M	11	–	5	.688	24	–	9	.727
Baylor	9	–	7	.563	16	–	12	.571
Texas Tech	9	–	7	.563	19	–	11	.633
Houston	6	–	10	.375	16	–	15	.516
SMU	6	–	10	.375	11	–	16	.407
Rice	4	–	12	.250	7	–	20	.259
TCU	1	–	15	.063	6	–	21	.222
† 1979 SWC tournament winner Rankings from AP Poll

The 1979 Southwest Conference men's basketball tournament was held March 1–3, 1979 at The Summit in Houston, Texas. The first round took place February 24 at the higher seeded campus sites.

Number 1 seed Arkansas defeated 2 seed Texas 39–38 to win their 2nd championship and receive the conference's automatic bid to the 1979 NCAA tournament.

== Format and seeding ==
The tournament consisted of 9 teams in a single-elimination tournament. The 3 seed received a bye to the Quarterfinals and the 1 and 2 seed received a bye to the Semifinals.

Place	Seed	Team	Conference			Overall		
Place	Seed	Team	W	L	%	W	L	%
1	1	Arkansas	13	3	.813	25	5	.833
1	2	Texas	13	3	.813	21	8	.724
3	3	Texas A&M	11	5	.688	24	9	.727
4	4	Baylor	9	7	.563	16	12	.571
4	5	Texas Tech	9	7	.563	19	11	.633
6	6	Houston	6	10	.375	16	15	.516
6	7	SMU	6	10	.375	11	16	.407
8	8	Rice	4	12	.250	7	20	.259
9	9	TCU	1	15	.063	6	21	.222

== Tournament ==
Date	Winner	Score	Loser	Notes
First Round
Feb 24	5 Texas Tech	82-49	8 Rice	at Texas Tech
Feb 24	6 Houston	74-67	7 SMU	at Houston
Feb 24	4 Baylor	104-78	9 TCU	at Baylor
Quarterfinals
Mar 1	5 Texas Tech	63-62 (OT)	3 Texas A&M	
Mar 1	6 Houston	83-82	4 Baylor	
Semifinals
Mar 2	1 Arkansas	93-77	5 Texas Tech	
Mar 2	2 Texas	70-65	6 Houston	
Finals
Mar 3	1 Arkansas	39-38	2 Texas	
