= 1978–79 UCLA Bruins men's basketball team =

American college basketball season

1978–79 UCLA Bruins men's basketball

Pac-10 champions

NCAA tournament, Elite Eight
- Conference: Pacific-10

Ranking
- Coaches: No. 2
- AP: No. 2
- Record: 25–5 (15–3 Pac-10)
- Head coach: Gary Cunningham (2nd year)
- Assistant coaches: Jim Harrick; Craig Impelman
- Home arena: Pauley Pavilion

1978–79 Pacific-10 Conference men's basketball standings
	Conf.				Overall
Team	W		L	PCT	W		L	PCT
No. 2 UCLA	15	–	3	.833	25	–	5	.833
USC	14	–	4	.778	20	–	9	.690
Oregon State	11	–	7	.611	18	–	10	.643
Washington State	10	–	8	.556	18	–	9	.667
Arizona	10	–	8	.556	16	–	11	.593
Arizona State	7	–	11	.389	12	–	15	.444
Oregon	7	–	11	.389	12	–	15	.444
Stanford	6	–	12	.333	12	–	15	.444
Washington	6	–	12	.333	11	–	16	.407
California	4	–	14	.222	6	–	21	.222
Rankings from AP Poll

The 1978–79 UCLA Bruins men's basketball team represented the University of California, Los Angeles in the 1978–79 NCAA Division I men's basketball season. Gary Cunningham began his second year and final year as head coach. The Bruins started the season ranked 2nd in the nation (AP Poll). The Bruins started the season 3–0 before losing to #3 Notre Dame. UCLA's team finished 1st in the Pac-10 regular season. UCLA participated in the NCAA Tournament where they reached the Regional Final before losing 95–91 to DePaul (a team the Bruins had beaten in their second game of the season).

== Starting lineup ==
Position	Player	Class
F	Kiki Vandeweghe	Jr.
F	David Greenwood	Sr.
C	Gig Sims	Jr.
G	Roy Hamilton	Sr.
G	Brad Holland	Sr.

== Roster ==
1978–79 UCLA Bruins men's basketball team
Players
Coaches

Pos.	#	Name	Height	Weight	Year	Hometown
C	32	Darrell Allums	6 ft 9 in (2.06 m)	—	Jr	Los Angeles, California
F	34	David Greenwood (C)	6 ft 9 in (2.06 m)	222 lb (101 kg)	Sr	Lynwood, California
G	24	Roy Hamilton	6 ft 2 in (1.88 m)	180 lb (82 kg)	Sr	Los Angeles, California
G	14	Brad Holland	6 ft 3 in (1.91 m)	217 lb (98 kg)	Sr	Billings, Montana
G	43	Rennie Kelly	6 ft 3 in (1.91 m)	—	Sr
G	20	Tyren Naulls	6 ft 3 in (1.91 m)	—	Fr
F	52	Mike Sanders	6 ft 6 in (1.98 m)	—	Fr	Vidalia, Louisiana
C	31	Gig Sims	6 ft 9 in (2.06 m)	—	Jr
G	50	Marvin Thomas	6 ft 5 in (1.96 m)	—	Sr
F	55	Kiki Vandeweghe	6 ft 7 in (2.01 m)	220 lb (100 kg)	Jr	Wiesbaden, West Germany
F	35	James Wilkes	6 ft 7 in (2.01 m)	195 lb (88 kg)	Jr	Nashville, Tennessee

Head coach

Gary Cunningham (UCLA)

Assistant coach(es)

Legend

- (C) Team captain
- (S) Suspended
- (I) Ineligible
- (W) Walk-on
- Injured
- Current redshirt

Roster

== Schedule ==
Date time, TV	Rank^{#}	Opponent^{#}	Result	Record	Site city, state
Regular Season
November 24, 1978	No. 2	Boise State	W 79–59	1–0	Pauley Pavilion (11,058); Los Angeles, CA
November 25, 1978	No. 2	DePaul	W 108–85	2–0	Pauley Pavilion (12,178); Los Angeles, CA
December 2, 1978	No. 2	Santa Clara	W 87–73	3–0	Pauley Pavilion (11,829); Los Angeles, CA
December 9, 1978	No. 2	No. 3 Notre Dame	L 78–81	3–1	Pauley Pavilion (12,721); Los Angeles, CA
December 16, 1978	No. 5	San Diego State	W 97–73	4–1	Pauley Pavilion (10,852); Los Angeles, CA
December 22, 1978	No. 3	Fordham	W 95–64	5–1	Pauley Pavilion (9,732); Los Angeles, CA
December 23, 1978	No. 3	Boston College	W 103–81	6–1	Pauley Pavilion (10,489); Los Angeles, CA
December 27, 1978	No. 3	at Stanford	L 72–75	6–2 (0–1)	Maples Pavilion (7,946); Stanford, CA
December 28, 1978	No. 3	at California	W 95–67	7–2 (1–1)	Harmon Gym (6,500); Berkeley, CA
January 4, 1979	No. 6	Oregon State	W 65–63	8–2 (2–1)	Pauley Pavilion (12,374); Los Angeles, CA
January 6, 1979	No. 6	Rutgers	W 78–57	9–2	Pauley Pavilion (12,176); Los Angeles, CA
January 8, 1979	No. 6	Oregon	W 74–71	10–2 (3–1)	Pauley Pavilion (11,433); Los Angeles, CA
January 13, 1979	No. 6	at USC	W 89–86	11–2 (4–1)	Los Angeles Memorial Sports Arena (14,696); Los Angeles, CA
January 18, 1979	No. 3	at Arizona	L 69–70	11–3 (4–1)	McKale Center (14,606); Tucson, AZ
January 20, 1979	No. 3	at Arizona State	W 95–79	12–3 (5–2)	ASU Activity Center (14,301); Tempe, AZ
January 25, 1979	No. 6	Washington State	W 89–71	13–3 (6–2)	Pauley Pavilion (12,173); Los Angeles, CA
January 27, 1979	No. 6	Washington	W 86–61	14–3 (7–2)	Pauley Pavilion (12,052); Los Angeles, CA
February 1, 1979	No. 6	at Oregon	W 65–58	15–3 (8–2)	McArthur Court (10,000); Eugene, OR
February 3, 1979	No. 6	at Oregon State	W 69–56	16–3 (9–2)	Gill Coliseum (10,427); Corvallis, OR
February 9, 1979	No. 4	USC	W 102–94 ^{OT}	17–3 (10–2)	Pauley Pavilion (12,591); Los Angeles, CA
February 11, 1979	No. 4	at No. 1 Notre Dame	W 56–52	18–3	Athletic & Convocation Center (11,343); Notre Dame, IN
February 15, 1979	No. 2	Arizona State	W 85–83	19–3 (11–2)	Pauley Pavilion (12,066); Los Angeles, CA
February 17, 1979	No. 2	Arizona	W 110–86	20–3 (12–2)	Pauley Pavilion (11,746); Los Angeles, CA
February 22, 1979	No. 1	at Washington	L 68–69	20–4 (12–3)	Hec Edmundson Pavilion (7,000); Seattle, WA
February 24, 1979	No. 1	at Washington State	W 110–102 ^{3OT}	21–4 (13–3)	WSU Performing Arts Coliseum (11,754); Pullman, WA
March 1, 1979	No. 3	California	W 79–68	22–4 (14–3)	Pauley Pavilion (12,129); Los Angeles, CA
March 3, 1979	No. 3	Stanford	W 99–71	23–4 (15–3)	Pauley Pavilion (12,322); Los Angeles, CA
NCAA Tournament
March 11, 1979	(1 W) No. 2	vs. (9 W) Pepperdine; Second Round	W 76–71	24–4	Pauley Pavilion (12,181); Los Angeles, CA
March 15, 1979	(1 W) No. 2	vs. (4 W) No. 12 San Francisco; Regional semifinals	W 99–81	25–4	Marriott Center (15,139); Provo, UT
March 17, 1979	(1 W) No. 2	vs. (2 W) No. 6 DePaul; Regional Finals	L 91–95	25–5	Marriott Center (13,126); Provo, UT
*Non-conference game. ^{#}Rankings from AP Poll. (#) Tournament seedings in parentheses. All times are in Pacific time.

== Rankings ==
Ranking movements Legend: ██ Increase in ranking ██ Decrease in ranking — = Not ranked
	Week																
Poll	Pre	1	2	3	4	5	6	7	8	9	10	11	12	13	14	15	Final
AP	2	2	2	5	3	3	6	6	3	6	5	4	2	1	3	2	2
Coaches	2	—	—	5	3	3	5	6	4	7	3	3	1	1	3	2	Not released

^Coaches did not release Week 1 or Week 2 polls.

== NBA draft ==
Year	Round	Pick	Player	NBA Team
1979	1	2	David Greenwood	Chicago Bulls
1979	1	10	Roy Hamilton	Detroit Pistons
1979	1	14	Brad Holland	Los Angeles Lakers

== Notes ==
- David Greenwood will be inducted into the National Collegiate Basketball Hall of Fame as a member of the Class of 2021
