= 1979 ACC tournament =

1979 ACC tournament may refer to:

- 1979 ACC men's basketball tournament
- 1979 ACC women's basketball tournament
- 1979 Atlantic Coast Conference baseball tournament
