= 1979 Big Sky Conference men's basketball tournament =

- Classification: Division I
- Season: 1978–79
- Teams: 4
- Site: Dee Events Center; Ogden, Utah
- Champions: Weber State (2nd title)
- Winning coach: Neil McCarthy (2nd title)
- MVP: Bruce Collins (Weber State)

1978–79 Big Sky men's basketball standings
	Conf.				Overall
Team	W		L	PCT	W		L	PCT
Weber State †	10	–	4	.714	25	–	9	.735
Northern Arizona	8	–	6	.571	14	–	14	.500
Idaho State	8	–	6	.571	14	–	13	.519
Montana	7	–	7	.500	14	–	13	.519
Gonzaga	7	–	7	.500	16	–	10	.615
Montana State	6	–	8	.429	15	–	11	.577
Boise State	6	–	8	.429	11	–	15	.423
Idaho	4	–	10	.286	11	–	15	.423
† Big Sky Conference tournament winner

The 1979 Big Sky Conference men's basketball tournament was the fourth edition of the tournament, held March 2–3 at the Dee Events Center at Weber State College in Ogden, Utah.

Top-seeded Weber State defeated Northern Arizona in the championship game, 92–70, to clinch their second of three consecutive titles in the tournament. The Wildcats were in the first five finals, dropping the first two and winning the next three.

== Format ==
First played in 1976, the Big Sky tournament had the same format for its first eight editions. The regular season champion hosted and only the top four teams from the standings took part, with seeding based on regular season conference records.

In their last season in the conference, Gonzaga tied for fourth in the standings (7–7) but did not qualify; they lost their final game to Boise State in overtime and were on the short end of the tiebreaker with Montana for the fourth seed.

== Bracket ==
Semifinals; Friday, March 2
1	Weber State	98
4	Montana	71
3	Northern Arizona	90
2	Idaho State	76

Championship; Saturday, March 3
1	Weber State	92
3	Northern Arizona	70

== NCAA tournament ==
Weber State received an automatic bid to the expanded 40-team NCAA tournament, where they were seeded seventh in the Midwest region, the first time the Big Sky representative was not in the West region. The Wildcats defeated New Mexico State in overtime in the first round in Lawrence, Kansas, but were stopped by second-seeded Arkansas.
