= 1978–79 Arkansas Razorbacks men's basketball team =

American college basketball season

1978–79 Arkansas Razorbacks men's basketball

Southwest Conference champions Southwest Conference Tournament champions

NCAA tournament, Elite Eight
- Conference: Southwest Conference

Ranking
- Coaches: No. 6
- AP: No. 5
- Record: 25-5 (13–3 SWC)
- Head coach: Eddie Sutton (5th season)
- Home arena: Barnhill Arena

1978–79 Southwest Conference men's basketball standings
	Conf.				Overall
Team	W		L	PCT	W		L	PCT
No. 5 Arkansas†	13	–	3	.813	25	–	5	.833
Texas	13	–	3	.813	21	–	8	.724
Texas A&M	11	–	5	.688	24	–	9	.727
Baylor	9	–	7	.563	16	–	12	.571
Texas Tech	9	–	7	.563	19	–	11	.633
Houston	6	–	10	.375	16	–	15	.516
SMU	6	–	10	.375	11	–	16	.407
Rice	4	–	12	.250	7	–	20	.259
TCU	1	–	15	.063	6	–	21	.222
† 1979 SWC tournament winner Rankings from AP Poll

The 1978–79 Arkansas Razorbacks men's basketball team represented the University of Arkansas in the 1978–79 college basketball season. The Razorbacks played their home games in Barnhill Arena in Fayetteville, Arkansas. Arkansas competed in the Southwest Conference. It was Eddie Sutton's fifth season as head coach of the Razorbacks. The Razorbacks won a share of the Southwest Conference championship, going 13–3 in league play and finishing with an overall record of 25–5. Arkansas shared the league crown with Texas, whom they beat in the 1979 SWC tournament championship game to clinch a berth to the NCAA tournament. Arkansas earned the 2 seed in the tournament's Midwest region, receiving a first-round bye and advancing to the Elite Eight after beating Weber State in the second round and #13 Louisville in the Sweet Sixteen before losing to Larry Bird and #1 Indiana State in a controversial outcome after a missed tripping call late in the game.

1979 was Arkansas's third consecutive and seventeenth overall SWC championship, as well as its second SWC Tournament championship. The run to the Elite Eight came as part of the Razorbacks' seventh appearance in the NCAA Tournament, also making the tournament the previous two seasons. 1979 was Sutton's third conference title with Arkansas out of the five he would eventually win in his tenure at Arkansas. Arkansas entered the polls at #20 on December 25, 1978, and would remain ranked the whole season, coming in at #5 in the final AP Poll for the second consecutive year. As the last remaining member of the famed "Triplets" following the departure of All-Americans and NBA Draft picks Ron Brewer and Marvin Delph, Sidney Moncrief was named an All-American for the second consecutive year and was drafted fifth overall by the Milwaukee Bucks in the 1979 NBA draft, the highest pick in Arkansas history. Senior center Steve Schall was drafted in the fifth round by the San Antonio Spurs. Marvin Delph, a senior on the previous year's team was drafted for a second time by the Boston Celtics in the sixth round.

== Roster ==
Roster retrieved from HogStats.com.

1978–79 Arkansas Razorbacks men's basketball team
Players
Coaches

Pos.	#	Name	Height	Weight	Year	Previous school	Hometown
G	32	Sidney Moncrief	6 ft 4 in (1.93 m)	190 lb (86 kg)	Sr	Hall High School	Little Rock, Arkansas
G	24	U.S. Reed	6 ft 2 in (1.88 m)	175 lb (79 kg)	So	Pine Bluff High School	Pine Bluff, Arkansas
C	30	Steve Schall	6 ft 10 in (2.08 m)	220 lb (100 kg)	Sr	Raytown South High School	Raytown, Missouri
C	44	Scott Hastings	6 ft 10 in (2.08 m)	235 lb (107 kg)	Fr	Independence High School	Independence, Kansas
F	20	Alan Zahn	6 ft 7 in (2.01 m)	200 lb (91 kg)	Jr	Manzano High School	Albuquerque, New Mexico
F	42	Keith Peterson	6 ft 6 in (1.98 m)	217 lb (98 kg)	Fr	Parkview High School	Little Rock, Arkansas
C	50	James Crockett	6 ft 9 in (2.06 m)	220 lb (100 kg)	So	West Helena High School	West Helena, Arkansas
G/F	40	Tony Brown	6 ft 6 in (1.98 m)	195 lb (88 kg)	Fr	Farragut High School	Chicago, Illinois
G	34	Mike Young	6 ft 4 in (1.93 m)	185 lb (84 kg)	So	Central Noble High School	Wolflake, Indiana
G/F	12	Brad Friess	6 ft 6 in (1.98 m)	200 lb (91 kg)	Fr	Anderson High School	Austin, Texas
C	22	David Scott	6 ft 8 in (2.03 m)	195 lb (88 kg)	Fr	Riley High School	Indianapolis, Indiana
G	22	Rege Craft	6 ft 4 in (1.93 m)	—	Fr	Garden City High School	Garden City, Kansas
G	21	Mike Buckrop	6 ft 1 in (1.85 m)	165 lb (75 kg)	Jr	Ben Davis High School; Northwest College	Indianapolis, Indiana
G	52	Alvin Bailey	6 ft 3 in (1.91 m)	195 lb (88 kg)	Fr	West Helena High School	West Helena, Arkansas
G	10	Eugene Nash	6 ft 0 in (1.83 m)	164 lb (74 kg)	Fr	Rivercrest High School	Tyronza, Arkansas

Head coach

Eddie Sutton (Oklahoma State)

Assistant coach(es)

Legend

- (C) Team captain
- (S) Suspended
- (I) Ineligible
- (W) Walk-on
- Injured
- Current redshirt

Roster
Last update: January 20, 2022

== Schedule and results ==
Schedule retrieved from HogStats.com.

Date time, TV	Rank^{#}	Opponent^{#}	Result	Record	Site city, state
Exhibition
November 21, 1978*		Russian Nationals	L 79–81 ^{2OT}	0–0	Barton Coliseum; Little Rock, Arkansas
December 9, 1978*; KHJ		vs. Athletes in Action	L 68–75	0–0	Anaheim, California
Regular Season
December 2, 1978*		Oklahoma	W 80–74	1–0	Barnhill Arena; Fayetteville, Arkansas
December 6, 1978*		West Texas State University	W 84–54	2–0	Barnhill Arena; Fayetteville, Arkansas
December 11, 1978*		Southeast Missouri State	W 90–51	3–0	Barnhill Arena; Fayetteville, Arkansas
December 16, 1978*		Centenary	W 77–57	4–0	Barnhill Arena; Fayetteville, Arkansas
December 19, 1978*		vs. Mississippi	W 67–66	5–0	Memphis, Tennessee
December 23, 1978*		vs. Southern Miss	W 93–79	6–0	Pine Bluff Convention Center; Pine Bluff, Arkansas
December 30, 1978*	No. 20	Memphis State	W 82–69	7–0	Barton Coliseum; Little Rock, Arkansas
January 4, 1979*	No. 14	North Texas State	W 96–71	8–0	Barton Coliseum; Little Rock, Arkansas
January 6, 1979	No. 14	at Houston	W 62–61	9–0 (1–0)	Hofheinz Pavilion; Houston, Texas
January 10, 1979	No. 10	Rice	W 79–66	10–0 (2–0)	Barnhill Arena; Fayetteville, Arkansas
January 12, 1979	No. 10	Texas	L 63–66	10–1 (2–1)	Barnhill Arena; Fayetteville, Arkansas
January 14, 1979*	No. 10	vs. No. 3 North Carolina	L 57–63	10–2	Greensboro Coliseum; Greensboro, North Carolina
January 17, 1979	No. 11	at No. 15 Texas A&M	L 69–74 ^{OT}	10–3 (2–2)	G. Rollie White Coliseum; College Station, Texas
January 20, 1979	No. 11	at TCU	W 90–51	11–3 (3–2)	Daniel–Meyer Coliseum; Fort Worth, Texas
January 22, 1979	No. 11	Baylor	L 67–70	11–4 (3–3)	Barnhill Arena; Fayetteville, Arkansas
January 24, 1979	No. 15	at SMU	W 79–67	12–4 (4–3)	Moody Coliseum; Dallas, Texas
January 27, 1979	No. 15	Texas Tech	W 63–57	13–4 (5–3)	Barnhill Arena; Fayetteville, Arkansas
February 1, 1979	No. 14	at No. 11 Texas	W 68–58	14–4 (6–3)	Frank Erwin Center; Austin, Texas
February 3, 1979	No. 14	at Rice	W 68–50	15–4 (7–3)	Tudor Fieldhouse; Houston, Texas
February 6, 1979	No. 14	No. 11 Texas A&M	W 60–56	16–4 (8–3)	Barnhill Arena; Fayetteville, Arkansas
February 10, 1979	No. 14	TCU	W 108–65	17–4 (9–3)	Barnhill Arena; Fayetteville, Arkansas
February 12, 1979	No. 14	at Baylor	W 71–62	18–4 (10–3)	Heart O' Texas Fair Coliseum; Waco, Texas
February 14, 1979	No. 11	SMU	W 71–55	19–4 (11–3)	Barnhill Arena; Fayetteville, Arkansas
February 17, 1979	No. 11	Houston	W 78–58	20–4 (12–3)	Barnhill Arena; Fayetteville, Arkansas
February 20, 1979	No. 10	at Texas Tech	W 66–65	21–4 (13–3)	Lubbock Municipal Coliseum; Lubbock, Texas
SWC tournament
March 2, 1979*	(1) No. 9	vs. (5) Texas Tech; Semifinals	W 93–77	22–4	The Summit; Houston, Texas
March 3, 1979*	(1) No. 9	vs. (2) No. 14 Texas; Championship	W 39–38	23–4	The Summit; Houston, Texas
NCAA tournament
March 11, 1979*	(2 MW) No. 7	vs. (7 MW) Weber State; Second Round	W 74–63	24–4	Allen Field House; Lawrence, Kansas
March 15, 1979*	(2 MW) No. 5	vs. (3 MW) No. 13 Louisville; Sweet Sixteen	W 73–62	25–4	Riverfront Coliseum; Cincinnati, Ohio
March 17, 1979*	(2 MW) No. 5	vs. (1 MW) No. 1 Indiana State; Elite Eight	L 71–73	25–5	Riverfront Coliseum; Cincinnati, Ohio
*Non-conference game. ^{#}Rankings from AP Poll. (#) Tournament seedings in parentheses. All times are in Central Time.
