= 1978–79 Pepperdine Waves men's basketball team =

American college basketball season

1978–79 Pepperdine Waves men's basketball

NCAA tournament, Second round
- Conference: West Coast Athletic Conference
- Record: 23–9 (10–4 WCAC)
- Head coach: Gary Colson (11th season)
- Home arena: Firestone Fieldhouse

1978–79 West Coast Athletic Conference men's basketball standings
| | Conf. | | | | Overall |
| Team | W | | L | PCT | W | | L | PCT |
|---|---|---|---|---|---|---|---|---|
| No. 12 San Francisco | 12 | – | 2 | .857 | 22 | – | 7 | .759 |
| Pepperdine | 10 | – | 4 | .714 | 22 | – | 10 | .688 |
| Nevada | 9 | – | 5 | .643 | 21 | – | 7 | .750 |
| Seattle | 8 | – | 6 | .571 | 15 | – | 11 | .577 |
| Santa Clara | 6 | – | 8 | .429 | 13 | – | 14 | .481 |
| Portland | 5 | – | 9 | .357 | 18 | – | 10 | .643 |
| Saint Mary's | 5 | – | 9 | .357 | 13 | – | 15 | .464 |
| Loyola Marymount | 1 | – | 13 | .071 | 5 | – | 21 | .192 |
Rankings from AP Poll

The 1978–79 Pepperdine Waves men's basketball team represented Pepperdine University in the 1978–79 NCAA Division I men's basketball season. The team was led by head coach Gary Colson. The Waves played their home games at the Firestone Fieldhouse and were members of the West Coast Athletic Conference. They finished the season 22–10 (later adjusted to 23–9), 10–4 in WCAC play to finish second in the regular season standings. Pepperdine received a bid to the NCAA tournament. In the opening round, the Waves beat No. 8 seed Utah before falling to No. 1 seed UCLA, 76–71.

== Roster ==
1978–79 Pepperdine Waves men's basketball team
Players
Coaches

| Pos. | # | Name | Height | Weight | Year | Previous school | Hometown |
|---|---|---|---|---|---|---|---|
| G | | Ricardo Brown | 6 ft 0 in (1.83 m) | — | Jr |
| SG | 43 | Tony Fuller | 6 ft 4 in (1.93 m) | 180 lb (82 kg) | Jr | Saint Martin de Porres | Detroit, Michigan |
| F | | Ollie Matson | 6 ft 6 in (1.98 m) | — | Sr |

Head coach

- Gary Colson

Assistant coach(es)

Legend

- (C) Team captain
- (S) Suspended
- (I) Ineligible
- (W) Walk-on
- Injured
- Current redshirt

== Schedule and results ==
| Date time, TV | Rank^{#} | Opponent^{#} | Result | Record | Site (attendance) city, state |
Non-conference regular season
| Nov 24, 1978* | | vs. No. 10 Indiana; Great Alaska Shootout | W 59–58 | 1–0 | Buckner Fieldhouse; Fort Richardson, Alaska |
| Nov 25, 1978* | | vs. No. 12 NC State; Great Alaska Shootout | L 62–91 | 1–1 | Buckner Fieldhouse; Fort Richardson, Alaska |
| Nov 26, 1978* | | vs. Lamar; Great Alaska Shootout | W 75–74 | 2–1 | Buckner Fieldhouse; Fort Richardson, Alaska |
WCAC Regular Season
| Feb 23, 1979 | | at San Francisco | L 69–72 | 20–8 (10–3) | War Memorial Gymnasium; San Francisco, California |
| Feb 24, 1979 | | at Santa Clara | L 74–85 | 20–9 (10–4) | Toso Pavilion; Santa Clara, California |
| Feb 26, 1979* | | Centenary | W 104–86 | 21–9 | Firestone Fieldhouse; Malibu, California |
NCAA Tournament
| Mar 9, 1979* | (9 W) | vs. (8 W) Utah; First round | W 92–88 ^{OT} | 22–9 | Pauley Pavilion; Los Angeles, California |
| Mar 11, 1979* | (9 W) | vs. (1 W) No. 2 UCLA; Second round | L 71–76 | 22–10 | Pauley Pavilion; Los Angeles, California |
*Non-conference game. ^{#}Rankings from AP Poll. (#) Tournament seedings in parentheses. W=West.
