= 1978–79 USC Trojans men's basketball team =

American college basketball season

1978–79 USC Trojans men's basketball

NCAA tournament, Round of 32
- Conference: Pacific-10 Conference
- Record: 20–9 (14–4 Pac-10)
- Head coach: Bob Boyd
- Home arena: L. A. Sports Arena

1978–79 Pacific-10 Conference men's basketball standings
	Conf.				Overall
Team	W		L	PCT	W		L	PCT
No. 2 UCLA	15	–	3	.833	25	–	5	.833
USC	14	–	4	.778	20	–	9	.690
Oregon State	11	–	7	.611	18	–	10	.643
Washington State	10	–	8	.556	18	–	9	.667
Arizona	10	–	8	.556	16	–	11	.593
Arizona State	7	–	11	.389	12	–	15	.444
Oregon	7	–	11	.389	12	–	15	.444
Stanford	6	–	12	.333	12	–	15	.444
Washington	6	–	12	.333	11	–	16	.407
California	4	–	14	.222	6	–	21	.222
Rankings from AP Poll

The 1978–79 USC Trojans men's basketball team represented the University of Southern California during the 1978–79 NCAA Division I men's basketball season. Led by head coach Bob Boyd, they played their home games at the L. A. Sports Arena in Los Angeles, California as members of the Pac-10 Conference. The Trojans were 14–4 in the Pac-10 and finished second in the conference regular season standings behind UCLA. USC received a bid to the NCAA tournament, the school's fifth appearance all-time.

== Roster ==
1978–79 USC Trojans men's basketball team
Players	Coaches
Pos. / # / Name / Height / Weight / Year / Previous school / Hometown; F / 44 / Cliff Robinson / 6 ft 9 in (2.06 m) / 220 lb (100 kg) / So / Castlemont / Oakland, CA	Head coach: Bob Boyd (USC); Assistant coach(es) Legend: (C) Team captain; (S) Suspended; (I) Ineligible; (W) Walk-on; Injured; Current redshirt

== Schedule and results ==
Date time, TV	Rank^{#}	Opponent^{#}	Result	Record	Site (attendance) city, state
Non-conference regular season
Nov 30, 1978*	No. 12	Houston	W 88–80	1–0	L.A. Sports Arena; Los Angeles, California
Dec 2, 1978*	No. 12	Utah	W 70–56	2–0	L.A. Sports Arena; Los Angeles, California
Dec 6, 1978	No. 11	at Stanford	W 57–55	3–0 (1–0)	Maples Pavilion; Stanford, California
Dec 13, 1978*	No. 12	at No. 1 Duke	L 65–79	3–1	Cameron Indoor Stadium; Durham, North Carolina
Dec 15, 1978*		vs. Xavier	L 68–75	3–2	Stokely Athletic Center; Knoxville, Tennessee
Dec 16, 1978*		vs. Niagara	W 75–68	4–2	Stokely Athletic Center; Knoxville, Tennessee
Dec 21, 1978*		No. 7 Kansas	W 89–83 ^{OT}	5–2	L.A. Sports Arena; Los Angeles, California
Dec 26, 1978		at California	W 59–54	6–2 (2–0)	Harmon Gym; Berkeley, California
Dec 29, 1978*		vs. Holy Cross	W 78–60	7–2	Cole Fieldhouse; College Park, Maryland
Dec 30, 1978*		at Maryland	L 79–83	7–3	Cole Fieldhouse; College Park, Maryland
Pac-10 regular season
Jan 5, 1979		Oregon	W 70–64	8–3 (3–0)	L.A. Sports Arena; Los Angeles, California
Jan 6, 1979		Oregon State	W 76–75	9–3 (4–0)	L.A. Sports Arena; Los Angeles, California
Jan 13, 1979		No. 6 UCLA	L 86–89	9–4 (4–1)	L.A. Sports Arena; Los Angeles, California
Jan 18, 1979		at Arizona State	W 69–65	10–4 (5–1)	ASU Activity Center; Tempe, Arizona
Jan 20, 1979*		at Texas	L 68–87	10–5	Frank Erwin Center; Austin, Texas
Jan 22, 1979		at Arizona	L 72–74	10–6 (5–2)	McKale Center; Tucson, Arizona
Jan 27, 1979		Washington State	W 67–61	11–6 (6–2)	L.A. Sports Arena; Los Angeles, California
Jan 30, 1979		Washington	W 69–59	12–6 (7–2)	L.A. Sports Arena; Los Angeles, California
Feb 3, 1979		at Oregon	W 87–64	13–6 (8–2)	McArthur Court; Eugene, Oregon
Feb 5, 1979		at Oregon State	L 67–70	13–7 (8–3)	Gill Coliseum; Corvallis, Oregon
Feb 9, 1979		at No. 4 UCLA	L 94–102	13–8 (8–4)	Pauley Pavilion; Los Angeles, California
Feb 15, 1979		Arizona	W 70–67	14–8 (9–4)	L.A. Sports Arena; Los Angeles, California
Feb 17, 1979		Arizona State	W 75–59	15–8 (10–4)	L.A. Sports Arena; Los Angeles, California
Feb 22, 1979		at Washington State	W 71–69	16–8 (11–4)	Friel Court at Beasley Coliseum; Pullman, Washington
Feb 24, 1979		at Washington	W 61–59	17–8 (12–4)	Hec Edmundson Pavilion; Seattle, Washington
Mar 1, 1979		Stanford	W 79–68	18–8 (13–4)	L.A. Sports Arena; Los Angeles, California
Mar 3, 1979		California	W 86–64	19–8 (14–4)	L.A. Sports Arena; Los Angeles, California
NCAA Tournament
Mar 9, 1979*		vs. Utah State; First round	W 86–67	20–8	Pauley Pavilion; Los Angeles, California
Mar 11, 1979*		vs. No. 8 DePaul; Second round	L 78–89	20–9	Pauley Pavilion; Los Angeles, California
*Non-conference game. ^{#}Rankings from AP Poll. (#) Tournament seedings in parentheses. All times are in Pacific Time.
