= 1979 Pacific Coast Athletic Association men's basketball tournament =

- Classification: Division I
- Season: 1978–79
- Teams: 8
- Site: Anaheim Convention Center; Anaheim, CA
- Champions: Pacific (1st title)
- Winning coach: Stan Morrison (1st title)
- MVP: Ron Cornelius (Pacific)
- Pacific Coast Athletic Association men's basketball tournaments

1978–79 Pacific Coast Athletic Association men's basketball standings
| | Conf. | | | | Overall |
| Team | W | | L | PCT | W | | L | PCT |
|---|---|---|---|---|---|---|---|---|
| Pacific † | 11 | – | 3 | .786 | 18 | – | 12 | .600 |
| Utah State | 9 | – | 5 | .643 | 19 | – | 11 | .633 |
| Fresno State | 9 | – | 5 | .643 | 16 | – | 12 | .571 |
| Cal State Fullerton | 7 | – | 7 | .500 | 16 | – | 11 | .593 |
| Long Beach State | 7 | – | 7 | .500 | 16 | – | 12 | .571 |
| UC Santa Barbara (Note: UC Santa Barbara was forced to vacated all wins during the 1978–79 season due to the use of ineligible players. UC Santa Barbara Record Book still includes win and loss totals.) | 6 | – | 8 | .429 | 12 | – | 15 | .444 |
| San Jose State | 4 | – | 10 | .286 | 7 | – | 20 | .259 |
| UC Irvine (Note: Two losses against UC Santa Barbara included in win count per UC Irvine Record Book.) | 3 | – | 11 | .214 | 9 | – | 19 | .321 |
† 1979 PCAA tournament winner Rankings from AP Poll

The 1979 Pacific Coast Athletic Association men's basketball tournament (now known as the Big West Conference men's basketball tournament) was held March 1–3 at the Anaheim Convention Center in Anaheim, California.

Top-seeded Pacific topped PCAA-newcomers Utah State in the championship game, 82–73, to win its first PCAA/Big West men's basketball tournament.

The Tigers, in turn, received a bid to the 1979 NCAA tournament. They were joined in the tournament by Utah State, who earned an at-large bid.

== Format ==
The tournament field expanded once more, this time increasing from seven to eight teams (UC Irvine and Utah State participated in their first PCAA tournament). Previous member San Diego State had departed for the Western Athletic Conference prior to the 1978–79 season.

All eight PCAA members qualified for the event and were seeded based on regular season conference records. All teams began play in the tournament bracket's first round.

== Bracket ==
First round Thursday, March 1
1 | Pacific | 57
8 | UC Irvine | 52
5 | Long Beach State | 79
4 | Cal State Fullerton | 70
3 | Fresno State | 75
6 | UC Santa Barbara | 62
7 | San José State | 78
2 | Utah State | 85

Semifinals; Friday, March 2
1 | Pacific | 74
5 | Long Beach State | 69
3 | Fresno State | 74
2 | Utah State | 81

Championship; Saturday, March 3
1 | Pacific | 82
2 | Utah State | 73
