= 1978–79 Idaho Vandals men's basketball team =

American college basketball season

1978–79 Idaho Vandals men's basketball
- Conference: Big Sky Conference
- Record: 11–15 (4–10 Big Sky)
- Head coach: Don Monson (1st season)
- Assistant coaches: Bob Emhiser; Barry Collier
- Home arena: Kibbie Dome

1978–79 Big Sky men's basketball standings
	Conf.				Overall
Team	W		L	PCT	W		L	PCT
Weber State †	10	–	4	.714	25	–	9	.735
Northern Arizona	8	–	6	.571	14	–	14	.500
Idaho State	8	–	6	.571	14	–	13	.519
Montana	7	–	7	.500	14	–	13	.519
Gonzaga	7	–	7	.500	16	–	10	.615
Montana State	6	–	8	.429	15	–	11	.577
Boise State	6	–	8	.429	11	–	15	.423
Idaho	4	–	10	.286	11	–	15	.423
† Big Sky Conference tournament winner

The 1978–79 Idaho Vandals men's basketball team represented the University of Idaho during the 1978–79 NCAA Division I men's basketball season. Members of the Big Sky Conference, the Vandals were led by first-year head coach Don Monson and played their home games on campus at the Kibbie Dome in Moscow, Idaho. They were 11–15 overall and 4–10 in conference play.

After four seasons with last place finishes in the conference, Jim Jarvis resigned as head coach in June 1978 under recurring allegations of illegal recruiting. The program had been placed on probation for one year in January, resulting in a reprimand for Jarvis and his assistant coach by the university.

He was succeeded in August by alumnus Monson, an assistant at Michigan State, who had significantly greater success. Although the Vandals were again in the cellar in 1979, the four conference wins were the most for the program in four years and the eleven wins the most in five. The groundwork had been made for significant improvement; Monson led Idaho to consecutive conference titles (1981, 1982) and the NCAA Sweet Sixteen in 1982.

Idaho's best-attended home games this season were the final two; 4,500 saw a fifteen-point loss to Boise State, while 4,600 enjoyed a 21-point upset of Idaho State in the finale. It was the Vandals' first win over the Bengals in four years; ISU had won the previous seven meetings. A month earlier, the Vandals won decisively at Boise to snap two losing streaks; six to the Broncos and fifteen in conference play.

The long-awaited win over Idaho State allowed the Vandals to regain possession of the "King Spud Trophy," an oversized metallic potato with a face and a crown, first played for in 1962. Bengal head coach Lynn Archibald thought it should go to the losing team: "It's the ugliest thing I've ever seen. The only good thing that happened last week was losing it."

No Vandals were named to the all-conference team; junior guard Don Newman was on the second team, and junior forward Reed Jaussi was honorable mention.

== Roster ==
1978–79 Idaho Vandals men's basketball team
Players
Coaches

Pos.	#	Name	Height	Weight	Year	Previous school	Hometown
G	3	Don Newman	6 ft 3 in (1.91 m)	190 lb (86 kg)	RS Jr	LSU	New Orleans, LA
G		Ted Strugar	6 ft 3 in (1.91 m)	—	Fr	Archb. Grace HS	Minneapolis, MN
G	10	Bill Hessing	6 ft 0 in (1.83 m)	—	Jr	Capital HS	Boise, ID
C	11	Jeff Brudie	6 ft 11 in (2.11 m)	—	So	Bonneville HS	Idaho Falls, ID
F	14	Reed Jaussi	6 ft 4 in (1.93 m)	—	Jr	Idaho Falls HS	Idaho Falls, ID
F	30	Terry Gredler	6 ft 7 in (2.01 m)	—	Jr
G/F	31	Dan Forge	6 ft 5 in (1.96 m)	—	So	Lewiston HS	Lewiston, ID
F/C	45	Chris Price	6 ft 8 in (2.03 m)	—	RS Sr		San Bernardino, CA
F		Ron Langrell	6 ft 7 in (2.01 m)	—	Sr	Roseburg HS	Roseburg, OR
		Bob Bronson	—	—
		Jim Bateman	—	—
		Jerry Lile	—	—
		Gaylen Weigand	—	—

Head coach

- Don Monson (Idaho)

Assistant coach(es)

- Bob Emhiser
- Barry Collier (Butler)

Legend

- (C) Team captain
- (S) Suspended
- (I) Ineligible
- (W) Walk-on
- Injured
- Current redshirt
