= 1978–79 UC Irvine Anteaters men's basketball team =

American college basketball season

1978–79 UC Irvine Anteaters men's basketball
- Conference: Pacific Coast Athletic Association
- Record: 9–17 (Note: UC Santa Barbara was forced to vacated all wins during the 1978–79 season, the UC Irvine record books officially counts their two losses against UC Santa Barbara as wins.) (3–11 PCAA)
- Head coach: Tim Tift (10th season)
- Home arena: Crawford Hall

1978–79 Pacific Coast Athletic Association men's basketball standings
	Conf.				Overall
Team	W		L	PCT	W		L	PCT
Pacific †	11	–	3	.786	18	–	12	.600
Utah State	9	–	5	.643	19	–	11	.633
Fresno State	9	–	5	.643	16	–	12	.571
Cal State Fullerton	7	–	7	.500	16	–	11	.593
Long Beach State	7	–	7	.500	16	–	12	.571
UC Santa Barbara (Note: UC Santa Barbara was forced to vacated all wins during the 1978–79 season due to the use of ineligible players. UC Santa Barbara Record Book still includes win and loss totals.)	6	–	8	.429	12	–	15	.444
San Jose State	4	–	10	.286	7	–	20	.259
UC Irvine (Note: Two losses against UC Santa Barbara included in win count per UC Irvine Record Book.)	3	–	11	.214	9	–	19	.321
† 1979 PCAA tournament winner Rankings from AP Poll

The 1978–79 UC Irvine Anteaters men's basketball team represented the University of California, Irvine during the 1978–79 NCAA Division I men's basketball season. This was the program's second season in Division I and 14th season overall. The Anteaters were led by tenth year head coach Tim Taft and played their home games at Crawford Hall as members of the Pacific Coast Athletic Association. They finished the season 9–17 and were 3–11 in PCAA play to finish 8th place. The anteaters were invited to the 1979 PCAA tournament as the eighth seed where they lost to the Pacific Tigers in the first round.

== Previous season ==
In their inaugural season as a Division I program, the 1977–78 Anteaters finished with a record of 8–17 and 2–12 PCAA play. The anteaters started the season with a record of 5–5, achieving their first victory as a Division I program against the Chico State Wildcats and their first victory versus a fellow Division I program against the Boise State Broncos. The anteaters struggled for the remainder of the season, going 3–12, and ended the year on a six-game losing streak.

== Off-season ==
=== Incoming transfer ===
Name	Pos.	Height	Weight	Year	Hometown	Notes
Lester Jones	G	6'0"	N/A	Jr.	N/A	Junior college transfer from Foothill Junior College
Victor Conyers	F	6'7"	N/A	Jr.	N/A	Junior college transfer from San Jose City College

=== 1978 Recruiting Class ===
College recruiting information (1977)
Name	Hometown	School	Height	Weight	Commit date
Robbie Beal; G	N/A		6 ft 3 in (1.91 m)	N/A	
Robbie Beal; G	Recruit ratings: No ratings found				
Louis Bremond; G	N/A		6 ft 0 in (1.83 m)	N/A	
Louis Bremond; G	Recruit ratings: No ratings found				
Overall recruit ranking:
Note: In many cases, Scout, Rivals, 247Sports, On3, and ESPN may conflict in their listings of height and weight.; In these cases, the average was taken. ESPN grades are on a 100-point scale.; Sources:

== Roster ==
1978–79 UC Irvine Anteaters men's basketball team
Players
Coaches

Pos.	#	Name	Height	Weight	Year	Hometown
G		Robbie Beal	6 ft 3 in (1.91 m)	—	Fr
C		Bret Bell	6 ft 8 in (2.03 m)	—	So
C		Phil Bolden	6 ft 6 in (1.98 m)	—	Sr
G		Louis Bremond	6 ft 0 in (1.83 m)	—	Fr
F		Quentin Brown	6 ft 6 in (1.98 m)	—	So
F		Victor Conyers	6 ft 8 in (2.03 m)	—	Jr
C		Lamont Jerrett	6 ft 10 in (2.08 m)	—
G		Lester Jones	6 ft 0 in (1.83 m)	—	Jr
G		Rick Jurk	6 ft 4 in (1.93 m)	—	So
F		Sam Maduro	6 ft 7 in (2.01 m)	—	Jr
F		Steve McGuire	6 ft 5 in (1.96 m)	—	Sr
F		Steve Rodgers	6 ft 8 in (2.03 m)	—	Jr
G		Mark Sullivan	6 ft 2 in (1.88 m)	—

Head coach

Tim Taft (Pepperdine)

Assistant coach(es)

Legend

- (C) Team captain
- (S) Suspended
- (I) Ineligible
- (W) Walk-on
- Injured
- Current redshirt

Roster
Last update: July 19, 2017

== Schedule and results ==
Date time, TV	Rank^{#}	Opponent^{#}	Result	Record	Site (attendance) city, state
Regular season
November 27, 1978*		Portland	L 58–86	0–1	Crawford Hall (755); Irvine, CA
November 28, 1978*		Northern Arizona	W 57–56 ^{OT}	1–1	Crawford Hall (682); Irvine, CA
December 2, 1978*		at Saint Mary's	L 56–67	1–2	McKeon Pavilion (1,000); Moraga, CA
December 9, 1978*		at Puget Sound	L 49–62	1–3	– (800); Tacoma, WA
December 11, 1978*		at Seattle Pacific	W 57–47	2–3	– (500); Seattle, WA
December 14, 1978*		at Portland	L 66–82	2–4	Howard Hall (1,089); Portland, OR
December 29, 1978*		vs. Puget Sound; Gaucho Tournament	L 49–64	2–5	Robertson Gymnasium (2,900); Santa Barbara, CA
December 30, 1978*		vs. San Diego; Gaucho Tournament	L 59–70	2–6	Robertson Gymnasium (2,900); Santa Barbara, CA
January 4, 1979*		MacMurray College	W 107–57	3–6	Crawford Hall (525); Irvine, CA
January 6, 1979*; 7:30 pm		Portland State	W 63–51	4–6	Crawford Hall (525); Irvine, CA
January 11, 1979		at Long Beach State	L 58–83	4–7 (0–1)	Long Beach Arena (3,769); Long Beach, CA
January 13, 1979; 8:05 pm		at UC Santa Barbara	L 63–66	4–8 (0–2)	Robertson Gymnasium (3,100); Santa Barbara, CA
January 16, 1979*; 7:30 pm		Loyola Marymount	L 54–55	4–9	Crawford Hall (875); Irvine, CA
January 18, 1979; 7:30 pm		Pacific	L 54–64	4–10 (0–3)	Crawford Hall (748); Irvine, CA
January 20, 1979; 7:30 pm		Fresno State	L 63 –64	4–11 (0–4)	Crawford Hall (842); Irvine, CA
January 25, 1979		Cal State Fullerton	L 57–73	4–12 (0–5)	Crawford Hall (1,552); Irvine, CA
January 28, 1979; 5:00 pm		at Cal State Fullerton	L 55–76	4–13 (0–6)	Titan Gym (2,909); Fullerton, CA
February 1, 1979		at San Jose State	W 62–61 ^{OT}	5–13 (1–6)	Spartan Gym (991); San Jose, CA
February 3, 1979		at Utah State	L 54–65	5–14 (1–7)	Smith Spectrum (8,279); Logan, UT
February 8, 1979		Utah State	W 56–54	6–14 (2–7)	Crawford Hall (878); Irvine, CA
February 10, 1979; 7:30 pm		San Jose State	W 80–71	7–14 (3–7)	Crawford Hall (1,005); Irvine, CA
February 15, 1979		at Fresno State	L 44–55	7–15 (3–8)	Selland Arena (5,991); Fresno, CA
February 17, 1979		at Pacific	L 53–73	7–16 (3–9)	Stockton Memorial Civic Auditorium (2,800); Stockton, CA
February 22, 1979; 7:30 pm		UC Santa Barbara	L 61–63	7–17 (3–10)	Crawford Hall (878); Irvine, CA
February 24, 1979		Long Beach State	L 63–64	7–18 (3–11)	Crawford Hall (1,525); Irvine, CA
PCAA tournament
March 1, 1979*		vs. Pacific; Quarterfinals	L 52–57	7–19	Anaheim Convention Center (7,470); Anaheim, CA
*Non-conference game. ^{#}Rankings from AP Poll. (#) Tournament seedings in parentheses. All times are in Pacific Time.

== Awards and honors ==
- Louis Bremond
  - PCAA All-Freshman Team
