= 1978–79 San Francisco Dons men's basketball team =

American college basketball season

1978–79 San Francisco Dons men's basketball

WCAC regular season champions

NCAA Tournament, Sweet Sixteen
- Conference: West Coast Athletic Conference

Ranking
- Coaches: No. 17
- AP: No. 12
- Record: 22–7 (12–2 WCAC)
- Head coach: Dan Belluomini (1st season)
- Home arena: War Memorial Gymnasium

1978–79 West Coast Athletic Conference men's basketball standings
	Conf.				Overall
Team	W		L	PCT	W		L	PCT
No. 12 San Francisco	12	–	2	.857	22	–	7	.759
Pepperdine	10	–	4	.714	22	–	10	.688
Nevada	9	–	5	.643	21	–	7	.750
Seattle	8	–	6	.571	15	–	11	.577
Santa Clara	6	–	8	.429	13	–	14	.481
Portland	5	–	9	.357	18	–	10	.643
Saint Mary's	5	–	9	.357	13	–	15	.464
Loyola Marymount	1	–	13	.071	5	–	21	.192
Rankings from AP Poll

The 1978–79 San Francisco Dons men's basketball team represented the University of San Francisco as a member of the West Coast Athletic Conference during the 1978–79 NCAA Division I men's basketball season. The Dons opened the season with a top 20 ranking, but fell out after a couple early season losses. San Francisco battled back to finish the season with a 22–7 record (12–2 WCAC) and a No. 12 ranking in the final AP poll. As champions of the West Coast Athletic Conference, San Francisco played in the NCAA Tournament as No. 4 seed in the West region. To date, this season marks the most recent time the Dons have reached the Sweet Sixteen.

Senior center Bill Cartwright was named conference Player of the Year for the third time and received consensus second-team All-American honors. He ended his career with the Dons as the top scorer and shot blocker (since surpassed) in school history and third on the career rebounding list.

== Roster ==
1978–79 San Francisco Dons men's basketball team
Players
Coaches

Pos.	#	Name	Height	Weight	Year	Hometown
F	44	Guy Williams	6 ft 9 in (2.06 m)	190 lb (86 kg)	Fr	Oakland, California
C	24	Bill Cartwright	7 ft 1 in (2.16 m)	235 lb (107 kg)	Sr	Elk Grove, California
C	34	Wallace Bryant	7 ft 0 in (2.13 m)	230 lb (104 kg)	Fr	Gary, Indiana

Head coach

- Dan Belluomini (San Francisco)

Assistant coach(es)

Legend

- (C) Team captain
- (S) Suspended
- (I) Ineligible
- (W) Walk-on
- Injured
- Current redshirt

== Schedule and results ==
Date time, TV	Rank^{#}	Opponent^{#}	Result	Record	Site city, state
Regular season
Nov 25, 1978*	No. 17	at UC Santa Barbara	W 91–68	1–0	Robertson Gymnasium; Santa Barbara, California
Nov 28, 1978*	No. 15	Cal State-Chico	W 77–53	2–0	War Memorial Gymnasium; San Francisco, California
Nov 30, 1978*	No. 15	at California	W 76–67	3–0	Harmon Gym; Berkeley, California
Dec 2, 1978*	No. 15	at No. 18 Nevada-Las Vegas	L 82–117	3–1	Las Vegas Convention Center; Las Vegas, Nevada
Dec 5, 1978*	No. 17	San Diego State	L 75–77	3–2	War Memorial Gymnasium; San Francisco, California
Dec 8, 1978*	No. 17	Stanford	W 87–77	4–2	War Memorial Gymnasium; San Francisco, California
Dec 9, 1978*	No. 17	Sacramento State	W 78–59	5–2	War Memorial Gymnasium; San Francisco, California
Dec 15, 1978*	No. 19	Pacific; Golden Gate Invitational	W 69–57	6–2	War Memorial Gymnasium; San Francisco, California
Dec 16, 1978*	No. 19	Texas A&M; Golden Gate Invitational	L 65–68	6–3	War Memorial Gymnasium; San Francisco, California
Dec 22, 1978*		San Francisco State	W 79–51	7–3	War Memorial Gymnasium; San Francisco, California
Dec 23, 1978*		Seattle Pacific	W 90–61	8–3	War Memorial Gymnasium; San Francisco, California
Dec 30, 1978*		Texas	W 69–48	9–3	War Memorial Gymnasium; San Francisco, California
Jan 5, 1979		at Loyola Marymount	W 95–66	10–3 (1–0)	Loyola Memorial Gymnasium; Los Angeles, California
Jan 18, 1979*		at No. 1 Notre Dame	L 69–88	13–4	Joyce Center; Notre Dame, Indiana
Feb 24, 1979		Loyola Marymount	W 103–69	21–6 (12–2)	War Memorial Gymnasium; San Francisco, California
NCAA Tournament
Mar 11, 1979*	(4 W) No. 12	vs. (5 W) Brigham Young; Second Round	W 86–63	22–6	McKale Center; Tucson, Arizona
Mar 15, 1979*	(4 W) No. 12	vs. (1 W) No. 2 UCLA; West Regional semifinal – Sweet Sixteen	L 81–99	22–7	Marriott Center; Provo, Utah
*Non-conference game. ^{#}Rankings from AP Poll. (#) Tournament seedings in parentheses. W=West. All times are in Pacific Time.

== Awards and honors ==
- Bill Cartwright – WCAC Player of the Year (3x), Consensus Second-team All-American

== Team players drafted into the NBA ==
Round	Pick	Player	NBA Club
1	3	Bill Cartwright	New York Knicks
