= 1978–79 Texas Tech Red Raiders basketball team =

American college basketball season

1978–79 Texas Tech Red Raiders basketball

National Invitation Tournament First round, L, 78–59 v. Georgetown
- Conference: Southwest Conference
- Record: 19–11 (9–7 SWC)
- Head coach: Gerald Myers (9th season)
- Home arena: Lubbock Municipal Coliseum

1978–79 Southwest Conference men's basketball standings
	Conf.				Overall
Team	W		L	PCT	W		L	PCT
No. 5 Arkansas†	13	–	3	.813	25	–	5	.833
Texas	13	–	3	.813	21	–	8	.724
Texas A&M	11	–	5	.688	24	–	9	.727
Baylor	9	–	7	.563	16	–	12	.571
Texas Tech	9	–	7	.563	19	–	11	.633
Houston	6	–	10	.375	16	–	15	.516
SMU	6	–	10	.375	11	–	16	.407
Rice	4	–	12	.250	7	–	20	.259
TCU	1	–	15	.063	6	–	21	.222
† 1979 SWC tournament winner Rankings from AP Poll

The 1978–79 Texas Tech Red Raiders men's basketball team represented Texas Tech University in the Southwest Conference during the 1978–79 NCAA Division I men's basketball season. The head coach was Gerald Myers, his 9th year with the team. The Red Raiders played their home games in the Lubbock Municipal Coliseum in Lubbock, Texas.
