= 1978–79 Pacific Tigers men's basketball team =

American college basketball season

1978–79 Pacific Tigers men's basketball

PCAA Regular season champions PCAA tournament champions

NCAA tournament
- Conference: Pacific Coast Athletic Association
- Record: 18–12 (11–3 PCAA)
- Head coach: Stan Morrison (7th season)
- Home arena: Pacific Pavilion

1978–79 Pacific Coast Athletic Association men's basketball standings
	Conf.				Overall
Team	W		L	PCT	W		L	PCT
Pacific †	11	–	3	.786	18	–	12	.600
Utah State	9	–	5	.643	19	–	11	.633
Fresno State	9	–	5	.643	16	–	12	.571
Cal State Fullerton	7	–	7	.500	16	–	11	.593
Long Beach State	7	–	7	.500	16	–	12	.571
UC Santa Barbara (Note: UC Santa Barbara was forced to vacated all wins during the 1978–79 season due to the use of ineligible players. UC Santa Barbara Record Book still includes win and loss totals.)	6	–	8	.429	12	–	15	.444
San Jose State	4	–	10	.286	7	–	20	.259
UC Irvine (Note: Two losses against UC Santa Barbara included in win count per UC Irvine Record Book.)	3	–	11	.214	9	–	19	.321
† 1979 PCAA tournament winner Rankings from AP Poll

The 1978–79 Pacific Tigers men's basketball team represented the University of the Pacific during the 1978–79 NCAA Division I men's basketball season. The Tigers were led by 7th-year head coach Stan Morrison and played their home games at the Stockton Memorial Civic Auditorium in Stockton, California as members of the Pacific Coast Athletic Association.

== Roster ==
1978–79 Pacific Tigers men's basketball team
Players	Coaches
Pos. / # / Name / Height / Weight / Year / Hometown; G / / Terence Carney / 6 ft 1 in (1.85 m) / — / Sr	Head coach: Stan Morrison (Pacific); Assistant coach(es) Legend: (C) Team captain; (S) Suspended; (I) Ineligible; (W) Walk-on; Injured; Current redshirt; Roster

== Schedule and results ==
Date time, TV	Rank^{#}	Opponent^{#}	Result	Record	Site (attendance) city, state
Regular season
Dec 2, 1978*		at Portland	L 85–87	0–1	Howard Hall; Portland, Oregon
Dec 9, 1978*		at Montana State	L 66–83	0–2	Worthington Arena; Havre, Montana
Dec 11, 1978*		at Montana	L 52–66	0–3	Dahlberg Arena; Missoula, Montana
Dec 15, 1978*		at No. 19 San Francisco	L 57–69	0–4	War Memorial Gymnasium; San Francisco, California
Dec 16, 1978*		vs. No. 15 Nevada-Las Vegas	L 85–95	0–5	War Memorial Gymnasium; San Francisco, California
Dec 28, 1978*		Texas	L 53–70	0–6	Pacific Pavilion; Stockton, California
Jan 3, 1979*		at Saint Mary's	L 74–77	0–7	McKeon Pavilion; Moraga, California
Jan 11, 1979		Utah State	W 86–82	1–7 (1–0)	Pacific Pavilion; Stockton, California
Jan 13, 1979		San Jose State	W 86–72	2–7 (2–0)	Pacific Pavilion; Stockton, California
Jan 18, 1979		at UC Irvine	W 64–54	3–7 (3–0)	Crawford Hall; Irvine, California
Jan 21, 1979		at Cal State Fullerton	L 63–81	3–8 (3–1)	Titan Gym; Fullerton, California
Jan 24, 1979		at Fresno State	L 56–66	3–9 (3–2)	Selland Arena; Fresno, California
Jan 26, 1979		Fresno State	W 57–40	4–9 (4–2)	Pacific Pavilion; Stockton, California
Feb 25, 1979		at San Jose State	W 96–84	15–11 (11–3)	Independence High School; San Jose, California
PCAA tournament
Mar 1, 1979*		vs. UC Irvine; Quarterfinals	W 57–52	16–11	Anaheim Convention Center; Anaheim, California
Mar 2, 1979*		vs. Long Beach State; Semifinals	W 74–69	17–11	Anaheim Convention Center; Anaheim, California
Mar 3, 1979*		vs. Utah State; Championship game	W 82–73	18–11	Anaheim Convention Center; Anaheim, California
NCAA tournament
Mar 10, 1979*	(6 W)	vs. (3 W) No. 12 Marquette; Second round	L 48–73	18–12	McKale Center; Tucson, Arizona
*Non-conference game. ^{#}Rankings from AP Poll. (#) Tournament seedings in parentheses. W=West. All times are in Pacific Time.
