= Gary Cunningham =

American basketball player, coach, and college athletics administrator

Biographical details
- Born: 1940 or 1941 (age 85–86)

Playing career
- 1960–1962: UCLA

Coaching career (HC unless noted)
- 1965–1975: UCLA (assistant)
- 1977–1979: UCLA

Administrative career (AD unless noted)
- 1979–1981: Western Oregon State
- 1981–1986: Wyoming
- 1986–1995: Fresno State
- 1995–2008: UC Santa Barbara

Head coaching record
- Overall: 50–8
- Tournaments: 3–2 (NCAA)

Accomplishments and honors

Championships
- 2× Pac-8/Pac-10 (1978–1979)

Awards
- Coach Wooden "Keys to Life" Award (2017); Pac-8 Coach of the Year (1978); First-team All-AAWU (1961); Second-team All-AAWU (1962)

Gary Cunningham (born c. 1940/1941) is an American former basketball player, coach, and college athletics administrator. He served as the head men's basketball coach at the University of California, Los Angeles (UCLA) from 1977 to 1979, guiding the UCLA Bruins to a 50–8 record in two seasons. UCLA won conference championships and finished with a #2 ranking in the final polls both seasons. Cunningham has the highest winning percentage of any coach in UCLA men's basketball history (.862). He left to become an associate professor and athletic director at Western Oregon State College, citing a love of administration more than coaching.

Cunningham played basketball at UCLA on the varsity team from 1960 to 1962. He played in the first Final Four appearance for the Bruins in the 1962 NCAA tournament. He appeared on the cover of Sports Illustrated on March 19, 1962. Cunningham was selected by the Cincinnati Royals in the seventh round as the 58th pick of the 1962 NBA draft.

Cunningham was an assistant coach at UCLA under John Wooden from 1965 to 1975. In 1965 he was the coach of the UCLA freshman team that featured high school All-Americans Lew Alcindor and Lucius Allen. The freshmen defeated the UCLA varsity, rated number-one in the nation, by a score of 75 to 60 in the first game ever played at Pauley Pavilion.

Cunningham retired in the summer of 2008 after 13 years as the athletic director at the University of California, Santa Barbara.

== Head coaching record ==
Record table
Season	Team	Overall	Conference	Standing	Postseason
UCLA Bruins (Pacific-8/Pacific-10 Conference) (1977–1979)
1977–78	UCLA	25–3	14–0	1st	NCAA Division I Sweet 16
1978–79	UCLA	25–5	15–3	1st	NCAA Division I Elite Eight
UCLA:		50–8	29–3		
Total:		50–8			
National champion Postseason invitational champion Conference regular season champion Conference regular season and conference tournament champion Division regular season champion Division regular season and conference tournament champion Conference tournament champion
