= Matthew White (basketball) =

American basketball player

Matt White
Personal information
- Born: August 15, 1957 New York City, New York
- Died: February 11, 2013 (aged 55) Nether Providence Township, Pennsylvania
- Listed height: 6 ft 10 in (2.08 m)

Career information
- High school: Choate (Wallingford, Connecticut)
- College: Penn (1976–1979)
- NBA draft: 1979: 5th round, 100th overall pick
- Drafted by: Portland Trail Blazers
- Position: Center

Career history
- 1979–1980: Valladolid
- 1980–1981: RC Náutico Tenerife
- 1986–1988: Cacaolat Granollers
- 1988–1990: Puleva Baloncesto Granada
- 1990–1992: Valvi Girona
- 1992–1993: Gijón
- Stats at Basketball Reference

Matthew Preston White "Matt" Wangler (August 15, 1957 – February 11, 2013) was an American basketball player for the University of Pennsylvania, and was later drafted by the Portland Trail Blazers. He helped lead Penn into the final four of the 1979 NCAA Men's Division I Basketball Tournament. He played professionally in the Liga ACB for Valladolid Miñón/Grupo Libro Valladolid, RC Náutico Tenerife, Cacaolat Granollers, Puleva Baloncesto Granada and Valvi Girona.

== Death ==
White was killed by his wife Maria Reyes Garcia-Pellon, a native of Spain, after she allegedly observed him watching child pornography. Police found no pornography on any of the computers in their home. She stabbed him several times in the throat. In court proceedings, a plea of temporary insanity was entered. His wife was suffering from schizo-affective disorder at the time and had been off her medication. Matthew had attempted to have her admitted to a psychiatric care center the day before his death, but was only able to make an appointment for the following day. In December 2014 a court dropped the murder charges during a bench trial, and she was subsequently found guilty but mentally ill of voluntary manslaughter. She was paroled pending availability of a bed at Norristown State Hospital
