= 1978–79 Gonzaga Bulldogs men's basketball team =

American college basketball season

1978–79 Gonzaga Bulldogs men's basketball
- Conference: Big Sky Conference
- Record: 16–10 (7–7 Big Sky)
- Head coach: Dan Fitzgerald (1st season)
- Home arena: Kennedy Pavilion

1978–79 Big Sky men's basketball standings
| | Conf. | | | | Overall |
| Team | W | | L | PCT | W | | L | PCT |
|---|---|---|---|---|---|---|---|---|
| Weber State † | 10 | – | 4 | .714 | 25 | – | 9 | .735 |
| Northern Arizona | 8 | – | 6 | .571 | 14 | – | 14 | .500 |
| Idaho State | 8 | – | 6 | .571 | 14 | – | 13 | .519 |
| Montana | 7 | – | 7 | .500 | 14 | – | 13 | .519 |
| Gonzaga | 7 | – | 7 | .500 | 16 | – | 10 | .615 |
| Montana State | 6 | – | 8 | .429 | 15 | – | 11 | .577 |
| Boise State | 6 | – | 8 | .429 | 11 | – | 15 | .423 |
| Idaho | 4 | – | 10 | .286 | 11 | – | 15 | .423 |
† Big Sky Conference tournament winner

The 1978–79 Gonzaga Bulldogs men's basketball team represented Gonzaga University during the 1978–79 NCAA Division I men's basketball season. Members of the Big Sky Conference, the Bulldogs were led by first-year head coach Dan Fitzgerald and played their home games on campus at Kennedy Pavilion in Spokane, Washington. They were 16–10 overall and 7–7 in conference play.

Gonzaga tied for fourth in the regular season standings but did not qualify for the four-team conference tournament. They lost their final game to Boise State in overtime and were on the short end of the tiebreaker with Montana for the fourth seed.

Senior center Paul Cathey was named to the all-conference team and four Bulldogs were honorable mention: guard Don Baldwin, guard Eddie White, forward Carl Pierce, and forward James Sheppard.

Hired in April 1978, Fitzgerald was previously an assistant at Santa Clara; he was also an assistant at Gonzaga during Adrian Buoncristiani's first two years (1972–74) and a teammate from high school (St. Ignatius) in San Francisco.

This was the sixteenth and final year in the Big Sky Conference for charter member Gonzaga; in the summer they moved to the West Coast Athletic Conference (WCAC), trading places with Nevada.

== Schedule ==
| Date time, TV | Rank^{#} | Opponent^{#} | Result | Record | Site city, state |
|---|---|---|---|---|---|
| Nov 25, 1978* | | at Whitworth | W 83–70 | 1–0 | |
| Nov 28, 1978* | | at Eastern Washington | W 74–63 | 2–0 | |
| Nov 30, 1978* | | at Loyola Marymount | W 70–55 | 3–0 | |
| Dec 2, 1978* | | at St. Martin’s | W 90–74 | 4–0 | |
| Dec 4, 1978* | | at Portland | L 76–91 | 4–1 | |
| Dec 8, 1978* | | at Central Washington | W 76–59 | 5–1 | |
| Dec 10, 1978* | | at Portland State | W 92–72 | 6–1 | |
| Dec 13, 1978* | | Washington State | L 63–66 | 6–2 | Spokane Coliseum |
| Dec 16, 1978* | | at Oregon State | L 58–59 | 6–3 | |
| Dec 22, 1978* | | at Wisconsin-Milwaukee | W 63–61 | 7–3 | |
| Dec 23, 1978* | | at Portland State | W 93–79 | 8–3 | |
| Dec 30, 1978* | | at College Of Great Falls | W 93–68 | 9–3 | |
| Jan 5, 1979 | | at Montana | L 53–68 | 9–4 | |
| Jan 6, 1979 | | at Montana State | W 95–72 | 10–4 | |
| Jan 13, 1979 | | at Idaho | W 66–61 | 11–4 | |
| Jan 19, 1979 | | at Weber State | L 61–62 | 11–5 | |
| Jan 20, 1979 | | at Northern Arizona | W 62–54 | 12–5 | |
| Jan 26, 1979 | | at Boise State | L 70–72 | 12–6 | |
| Jan 27, 1979 | | at Idaho State | L 75–79 | 12–7 | |
| Feb 2, 1979 | | at Montana State | W 70–64 | 13–7 | |
| Feb 3, 1979 | | at Montana | W 56–52 | 14–7 | |
| Feb 10, 1979 | | at Idaho | W 65–58 | 15–7 | |
| Feb 15, 1979 | | at Northern Arizona | L 65–84 | 15–8 | |
| Feb 17, 1979 | | at Weber State | L 66–73 | 15–9 | |
| Feb 23, 1979 | | at Idaho State | W 75–67 | 16–9 | |
| Feb 24, 1979 | | at Boise State | L 81–85 | 16–10 | |
*Non-conference game. ^{#}Rankings from AP Poll. (#) Tournament seedings in parentheses.
