= 1978–79 Texas Longhorns men's basketball team =

American college basketball season

1978–79 Texas Longhorns men's basketball

SWC Regular Season Co-Champions

NCAA Tournament, Second round
- Conference: Southwest Conference

Ranking
- Coaches: No. 15
- Record: 21–8 (13–3 SWC)
- Head coach: Abe Lemons (3rd season)
- Assistant coaches: Barry Dowd; Steve Moeller
- Home arena: Special Events Center

1978–79 Southwest Conference men's basketball standings
	Conf.				Overall
Team	W		L	PCT	W		L	PCT
No. 5 Arkansas†	13	–	3	.813	25	–	5	.833
Texas	13	–	3	.813	21	–	8	.724
Texas A&M	11	–	5	.688	24	–	9	.727
Baylor	9	–	7	.563	16	–	12	.571
Texas Tech	9	–	7	.563	19	–	11	.633
Houston	6	–	10	.375	16	–	15	.516
SMU	6	–	10	.375	11	–	16	.407
Rice	4	–	12	.250	7	–	20	.259
TCU	1	–	15	.063	6	–	21	.222
† 1979 SWC tournament winner Rankings from AP Poll

The 1978–79 Texas Longhorns men's basketball team represented the University of Texas at Austin in the 1978–79 NCAA Division I men's basketball season as a member of the Southwest Conference. They finished the season 21-8 overall, tied for the SWC regular season title with a 13–3 record and reached the NCAA tournament. They were coached by Abe Lemons in his third season as head coach of the Longhorns. They played their home games at the Special Events Center in Austin, Texas.

== Roster ==
Name	#	Position	Height	Weight	Year	Home Town	High School
Ron Baxter	12	Guard-Forward	6–4	205	Junior	Los Angeles	Dorsey
Brent Boyd	4	Guard	6–3	185	Junior	Baton Rouge, Louisiana	Catholic University
Tyrone Branyan	31	Forward	6–7	220	Senior	Placentia, California	El Dorado
Rob Cunningham	35	Forward-Center	6–8	215	Sophomore	Westport, Connecticut	Staples
John Danks	32	Forward	6–6	190	Junior	Beaver Dam, Kentucky	Ohio County
Ovie Dotson	15	Guard	6–5	200	Senior	San Antonio, Texas	Sam Houston
Henry Johnson	33	Forward	6–6	190	Sophomore	Los Angeles	Manual Arts
Jim Krivacs	11	Guard	6–1	160	Senior	Indianapolis	Southport
John Moore	00	Guard	6–1	170	Senior	Altoona, Pennsylvania	Altoona
Dave Shepard	44	Guard	6–4	205	Sophomore	Los Angeles	Manual Arts
Keith Stephens	52	Forward	6–8	210	Sophomore	Pasadena, California	Pasadena
Phillip Stroud	30	Forward	6–7	220	Senior	Houston, Texas	Wheatley

== Schedule ==
Date time, TV	Rank^{#}	Opponent^{#}	Result	Record	Site city, state
Regular season
Nov 24, 1978*	No. 6	at Long Beach State	L 71–76	0–1	Long Beach Arena; Long Beach, California
Nov 29, 1978*	No. 13	Arkansas State	W 68–54	1–1	Frank Erwin Center; Austin, Texas
Dec 2, 1978*	No. 13	BYU	W 96–57	2–1	Frank Erwin Center; Austin, Texas
Dec 5, 1978*	No. 13	at Oklahoma	L 65-71	2–2	Lloyd Noble Center; Norman, Oklahoma
Dec 9, 1978*	No. 13	Oklahoma State	W 85-70	3-2	Frank Erwin Center; Austin, Texas
Dec 16, 1978*	No. 17	Hardin-Simmons	W 68-58	4–2	Frank Erwin Center; Austin, Texas
Dec 28, 1978*		at Pacific	W 70–53	5–2	Pacific Pavilion; Stockton, California
Dec 30, 1978*		at San Francisco	L 48-69	5–3	Sobrato Center; San Francisco, California
Jan 4, 1979		TCU	W 92-63	6–3	Frank Erwin Center; Austin, Texas
Jan 6, 1979		at Texas Tech	L 74-92	6–4	Lubbock Municipal Coliseum; Lubbock, Texas
Jan 8, 1979		at Houston	W 75-57	7–4	Hofheinz Pavilion; Houston, Texas
Jan 12, 1979		at No. 10 Arkansas	W 66-63	8–4	Barnhill Arena; Fayetteville, Arkansas
Jan 16, 1979		at Rice	W 94-81	9–4	Rice Gymnasium; Houston, Texas
Jan 20, 1979*		USC	W 87-68	10–4	Frank Erwin Center; Austin, Texas
Jan 22, 1979	No. 17	No. 14 Texas A&M	W 89-66	11–4	Frank Erwin Center; Austin, Texas
Jan 24, 1979	No. 17	at Baylor	W 77-76	12–4	Heart O' Texas Coliseum; Waco, Texas
Jan 27, 1979	No. 17	SMU	W 98-62	13–4	Frank Erwin Center; Austin, Texas
Jan 28, 1979	No. 17	Houston	W 79-53	14–4	Frank Erwin Center; Austin, Texas
Feb 1, 1979	No. 11	No. 19 Arkansas	L 58-68	14–5	Frank Erwin Center; Austin, Texas
Feb 3, 1979	No. 11	at TCU	W 73-60	15–5	Daniel-Meyer Coliseum; Fort Worth, Texas
SWC tournament
Mar 2, 1979*	No. 14	vs. Houston; Semifinals	W 70–65	21–6	The Summit; Houston, Texas
Mar 3, 1979*	No. 14	vs. No. 9 Arkansas; Championship game	L 38–39	21–7	The Summit; Houston, Texas
NCAA tournament
Mar 11, 1979*	(4 MW)	vs. (5 MW) Oklahoma; Second round	L 76–90	21–8	Moody Coliseum; Dallas, Texas
*Non-conference game. ^{#}Rankings from AP Poll. (#) Tournament seedings in parentheses. MW=Midwest. All times are in Central Time.
