= 1978–79 Washington Huskies men's basketball team =

American college basketball season

1978–79 Washington Huskies men's basketball
- Conference: Pacific-10 Conference
- Record: 11–16 (6–12 Pac-10)
- Head coach: Marv Harshman (8th season)
- Assistant coach: Bob Johnson
- Home arena: Hec Edmundson Pavilion

1978–79 Pacific-10 Conference men's basketball standings
	Conf.				Overall
Team	W		L	PCT	W		L	PCT
No. 2 UCLA	15	–	3	.833	25	–	5	.833
USC	14	–	4	.778	20	–	9	.690
Oregon State	11	–	7	.611	18	–	10	.643
Washington State	10	–	8	.556	18	–	9	.667
Arizona	10	–	8	.556	16	–	11	.593
Arizona State	7	–	11	.389	12	–	15	.444
Oregon	7	–	11	.389	12	–	15	.444
Stanford	6	–	12	.333	12	–	15	.444
Washington	6	–	12	.333	11	–	16	.407
California	4	–	14	.222	6	–	21	.222
Rankings from AP Poll

The 1978–79 Washington Huskies men's basketball team represented the University of Washington for the 1978–79 NCAA Division I men's basketball season. Led by eighth-year head coach Marv Harshman, the Huskies were members of the Pacific-10 Conference and played their home games on campus at Hec Edmundson Pavilion in Seattle, Washington.

The Huskies were 11–16 overall in the regular season and 6–12 in conference play, tied for eighth in the standings, which now had ten teams. Washington lost five of its final six games, but the victory was over top-ranked UCLA.

There was no conference tournament yet; it debuted eight years later.
