= 1979 ACC men's basketball tournament =

American postseason collegiate men's basketball tournament

- Classification: Division I
- Season: 1978–79
- Teams: 7
- Site: Greensboro Coliseum; Greensboro, North Carolina
- Champions: North Carolina (8th title)
- Winning coach: Dean Smith (7th title)
- MVP: Dudley Bradley (North Carolina)
- Television: The C.D. Chesley Company

1978–79 ACC men's basketball standings
	Conf.				Overall
Team	W		L	PCT	W		L	PCT
No. 9 North Carolina †	9	–	3	.750	23	–	6	.793
No. 11 Duke	9	–	3	.750	22	–	8	.733
Virginia	7	–	5	.583	19	–	10	.655
Maryland	6	–	6	.500	19	–	11	.633
Clemson	5	–	7	.417	19	–	10	.655
NC State	3	–	9	.250	18	–	12	.600
Wake Forest	3	–	9	.250	12	–	15	.444
† 1979 ACC tournament winner Rankings from AP Poll

The 1979 Atlantic Coast Conference men's basketball tournament was held in Greensboro, North Carolina, at the Greensboro Coliseum from March 1–3. North Carolina defeated Duke, 71–63, to win the championship. Dudley Bradley of North Carolina was named the tournament MVP.

With the exception of the 1991 tournament, when Maryland was ineligible to participate due to NCAA sanctions, the 1979 event was the final ACC Tournament scheduled as a seven-team event and the final time the top seed received an automatic bye into the semifinals.

== Bracket ==
Quarterfinals; March 1
4	Maryland	75
5	Clemson	67
2	#5 Duke	58
7	Wake Forest	56
3	Virginia	78
6	NC State	82

Semifinals; March 2
1	#7 North Carolina	102
4	Maryland	79
2	#5 Duke	62
6	NC State	59

Championship Game; March 3
1	#7 North Carolina	71
2	#5 Duke	63

== Awards and honors ==
**1979 ACC Men's Basketball All-Tournament Teams**
First Team	Second Team
**Dudley Bradley** – North Carolina; Dave Colescott – North Carolina; Mike Gminski – Duke; Mike O'Koren – North Carolina; Jim Spanarkel – Duke	Clyde Austin – NC State; Larry Gibson – Maryland; Jeff Lamp – Virginia; Charles Whitney – NC State; Al Wood – North Carolina

MVP in bold
