= 1978–79 Weber State Wildcats men's basketball team =

American college basketball season

1978–79 Weber State Wildcats men's basketball

Big Sky champions
- Conference: Big Sky Conference
- Record: 25–9 (10–4 Big Sky)
- Head coach: Neil McCarthy (4th season)
- Home arena: Dee Events Center

1978–79 Big Sky men's basketball standings
	Conf.				Overall
Team	W		L	PCT	W		L	PCT
Weber State †	10	–	4	.714	25	–	9	.735
Northern Arizona	8	–	6	.571	14	–	14	.500
Idaho State	8	–	6	.571	14	–	13	.519
Montana	7	–	7	.500	14	–	13	.519
Gonzaga	7	–	7	.500	16	–	10	.615
Montana State	6	–	8	.429	15	–	11	.577
Boise State	6	–	8	.429	11	–	15	.423
Idaho	4	–	10	.286	11	–	15	.423
† Big Sky Conference tournament winner

The 1978–79 Weber State Wildcats men's basketball team represented Weber State College during the 1978–79 NCAA Division I men's basketball season. Members of the Big Sky Conference, the Wildcats were led by fourth-year head coach Neil McCarthy and played their home games on campus at Dee Events Center in Ogden, Utah.

They were 22–8 overall in the regular season and 10–4 in conference play, won the regular season title, and the conference tournament. The Wildcats appeared in the first five finals of the conference tournament; this was the second of three consecutive titles.

Weber State earned the Big Sky's automatic bid to the expanded 40-team NCAA tournament, where they were seeded seventh in the Midwest region, the first time the Big Sky representative was not in the West region. The Wildcats met New Mexico State in the first round in Lawrence, Kansas; the Aggies won the previous meeting in December. This time the Wildcats prevailed in overtime, but were stopped two days later by second-seeded Arkansas.

Three Wildcats, all juniors, were named to the all-conference team. Guard Bruce Collins was a repeat selection, joined by forward David Johnson and center Richard Smith; both were on the previous season's second team.

== Postseason results ==
Date time, TV	Rank^{#}	Opponent^{#}	Result	Record	Site (attendance) city, state
Big Sky tournament
Fri, March 2; 7:00 pm	(1)	(4) Montana; Semifinal	W 98–71	23–8	Dee Events Center; Ogden, Utah
Sat, March 3; 8:00 pm	(1)	(2) Northern Arizona; Final	W 92–70	24–8	Dee Events Center; Ogden, Utah
NCAA tournament
Fri, March 9*; 6:06 pm	(7 MW)	vs. (10 MW) New Mexico State; First round	W 81–78 ^{OT}	25–8	Allen Fieldhouse; Lawrence, Kansas
Sun, March 11*; 1:36 pm	(7 MW)	vs. (2 MW) No. 7 Arkansas; Second round	L 63–74	25–9	Allen Fieldhouse; Lawrence, Kansas
*Non-conference game. ^{#}Rankings from AP poll. (#) Tournament seedings in parentheses. All times are in Mountain time.
