= 1978–79 Duke Blue Devils men's basketball team =

American college basketball season

1978–79 Duke Blue Devils men's basketball

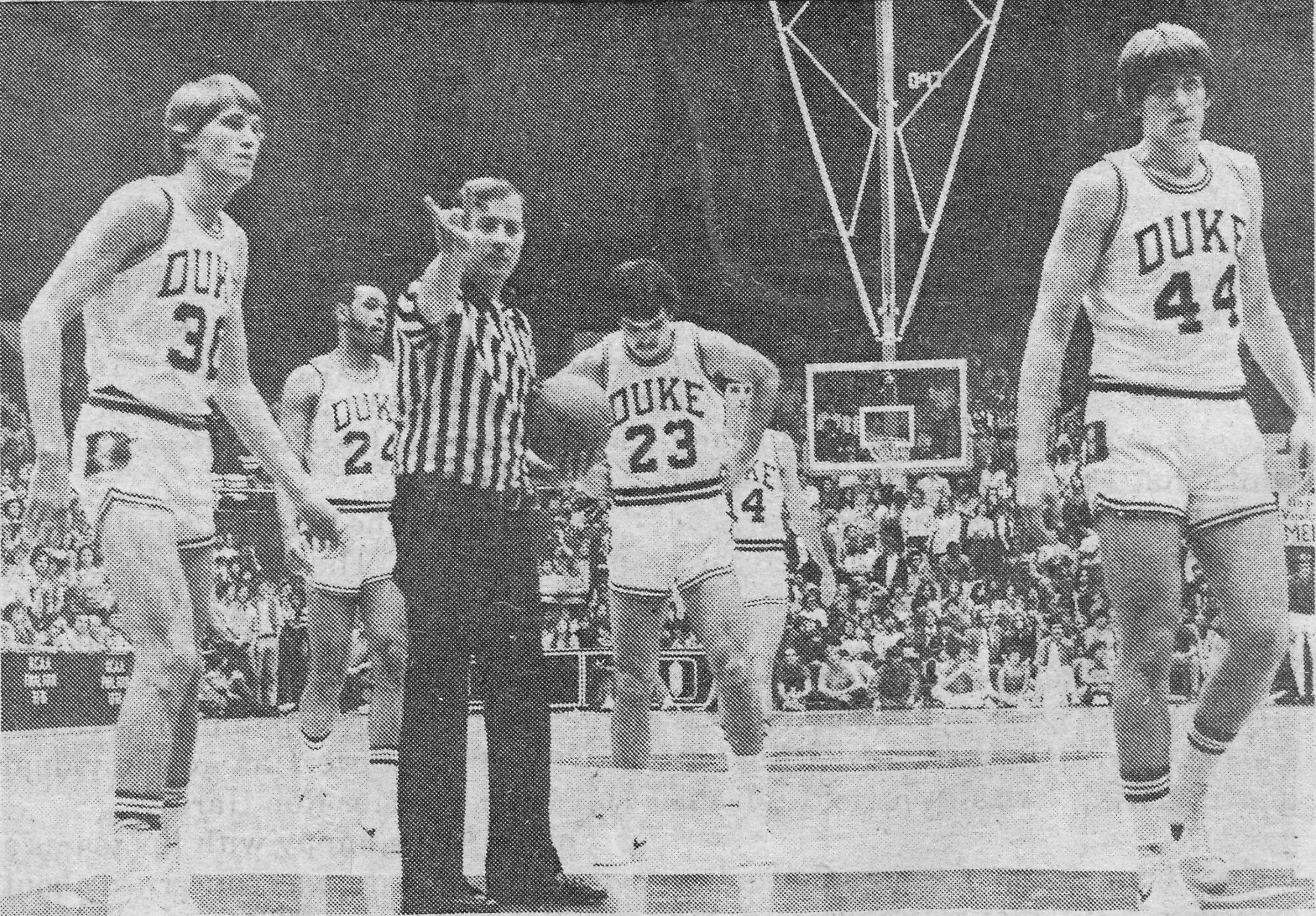
- Setting up for a free throw vs. NC State, February 14

ACC regular season co-champions

NCAA tournament, second round
- Conference: Atlantic Coast Conference

Ranking
- Coaches: No. 7
- AP: No. 11
- Record: 22–8 (9–3 ACC)
- Head coach: Bill Foster (5th season)
- Assistant coaches: Terry Chili; Steve Steinwedel; Bob Wenzel
- MVP: Jim Spanarkel
- Captain: Jim Spanarkel
- Home arena: Cameron Indoor Stadium

1978–79 ACC men's basketball standings
	Conf.				Overall
Team	W		L	PCT	W		L	PCT
No. 9 North Carolina †	9	–	3	.750	23	–	6	.793
No. 11 Duke	9	–	3	.750	22	–	8	.733
Virginia	7	–	5	.583	19	–	10	.655
Maryland	6	–	6	.500	19	–	11	.633
Clemson	5	–	7	.417	19	–	10	.655
NC State	3	–	9	.250	18	–	12	.600
Wake Forest	3	–	9	.250	12	–	15	.444
† 1979 ACC tournament winner Rankings from AP Poll

The 1978–79 Duke Blue Devils men's basketball team represented Duke University during the 1978–79 college basketball season.

== Roster ==
1978–79 Duke Blue Devils men's basketball team
Players
Coaches

Pos.	#	Name	Height	Weight	Year	Hometown
G	12	Vince Taylor	6 ft 5 in (1.96 m)	180 lb (82 kg)	Fr	Lexington, KY
G	14	Rob Hardy	6 ft 3 in (1.91 m)	170 lb (77 kg)	Sr	Columbus, OH
F	20	Gene Banks	6 ft 7 in (2.01 m)	205 lb (93 kg)	So	Philadelphia, PA
G	21	Bob Bender	6 ft 2 in (1.88 m)	175 lb (79 kg)	Jr	Crown Point, IN
G	22	John Harrell	6 ft 0 in (1.83 m)	170 lb (77 kg)	Jr	Durham, NC
G	23	Steve Gray	6 ft 2 in (1.88 m)	175 lb (79 kg)	Sr	Woodland Hills, CA
F	24	Harold Morrison	6 ft 7 in (2.01 m)	200 lb (91 kg)	Sr	West Orange, NJ
G/F	30	Jim Suddath	6 ft 6 in (1.98 m)	190 lb (86 kg)	So	East Point, GA
F	33	Kenny Dennard	6 ft 7 in (2.01 m)	200 lb (91 kg)	So	Walnut Cove, NC
G	34	Jim Spanarkel	6 ft 5 in (1.96 m)	190 lb (86 kg)	Sr	Jersey City, NJ
C	43	Mike Gminski	6 ft 11 in (2.11 m)	245 lb (111 kg)	Jr	Monroe, CT
C	44	Scott Goetsch	6 ft 9 in (2.06 m)	215 lb (98 kg)	Sr	Chatsworth, CA

Head coach

- Bill Foster

Assistant coach(es)

- Terry Chili
- Steve Steinwedel
- Bob Wenzel

Legend

- (C) Team captain
- (S) Suspended
- (I) Ineligible
- (W) Walk-on
- Injured
- Current redshirt

Compiled from multiple sources

== Schedule ==
Date time, TV	Rank^{#}	Opponent^{#}	Result	Record	Site city, state
November 25*	No. 1	at Western Kentucky	W 78–53	1–0	E. A. Diddle Arena; Bowling Green, KY
November 27*	No. 1	SMU	W 86–80	2–0	Cameron Indoor Stadium; Durham, NC
December 1*	No. 1	vs. No. 6 N.C. State; Big Four Tournament	W 65–63	3–0	Greensboro Coliseum; Greensboro, NC
December 2*	No. 1	vs. No. 14 North Carolina; Big Four Tournament	W 78–68	4–0	Greensboro Coliseum; Greensboro, NC
December 5*	No. 1	La Salle	W 66–42	5–0	Cameron Indoor Stadium; Durham, NC
December 13*	No. 1	No. 12 Southern California	W 79–65	6–0	Cameron Indoor Stadium; Durham, NC
December 29*	No. 1	vs. Ohio State; ECAC Holiday Tournament	L 84–90	6–1	Madison Square Garden; New York, NY
December 30*	No. 1	vs. St. John's; ECAC Holiday Tournament	L 66–69	6–2	Madison Square Garden; New York, NY
January 2*	No. 1	at Davidson	W 77–59	7–2	Davidson, NC
January 5*	No. 5	vs. No. 15 Long Beach State; Holiday Doubleheader	W 79–78	8–2	Reynolds Coliseum; Raleigh, NC
January 6*	No. 5	vs. Tulane; Holiday Doubleheader	W 74–64	9–2	Reynolds Coliseum; Raleigh, NC
January 10	No. 7	Clemson	W 73–54	10–2 (1–0)	Cameron Indoor Stadium; Durham, NC
January 13	No. 7	at No. 3 North Carolina	L 68–74	10–3 (1–1)	Carmichael Auditorium; Chapel Hill, NC
January 18	No. 8	Wake Forest	W 81–69	11–3 (2–1)	Cameron Indoor Stadium; Durham, NC
January 21	No. 8	at No. 14 N.C. State	W 75–69	12–3 (3–1)	Reynolds Coliseum; Raleigh, NC
January 24	No. 7	at Virginia	W 84–66	13–3 (4–1)	Charlottesville, VA
January 28*	No. 7	No. 13 Marquette	W 69–64	14–3 (4–1)	Cameroon Indoor Stadium; Durham, NC
January 31	No. 3	at Wake Forest	W 75–60	15–3 (5–1)	Winston-Salem, NC
February 3	No. 3	No. 17 Maryland	W 87–78	16–3 (6–1)	Cameroon Indoor Stadium; Durham, NC
February 6	No. 3	Virginia	W 64–63	17–3 (7–1)	Cameroon Indoor Stadium; Durham, NC
February 10*	No. 3	Pittsburgh	L 69–71	17–4 (7–1)	Cameroon Indoor Stadium; Durham, NC
February 14	No. 5	N.C. State	W 66–48	18–4 (8–1)	Cameroon Indoor Stadium; Durham, NC
February 16	No. 5	at Maryland	L 68–70	18–5 (8–2)	College Park, MD
February 18*	No. 5	vs. No. 9 Louisville	W 88–72	19–6 (8–2)	Charlotte Coliseum; Charlotte, NC
February 21	No. 6	at Clemson	L 49–70	19–7 (8–3)	Littlejohn Coliseum; Clemson, SC
February 24	No. 6	No. 4 North Carolina	W 47–40	20–6 (9–3)	Cameroon Indoor Stadium; Cameron, NC
ACC tournament
March 1*		vs. Wake Forest; ACC tournament • quarterfinals	W 58–56	21–6	Greensboro Coliseum; Greensboro, NC
March 2*		vs. N.C. State; ACC tournament • semifinals	W 62–59	22–6	Greensboro Coliseum; Greensboro, NC
March 3*		vs. North Carolina; ACC tournament • final	L 63–71	22–7	Greensboro Coliseum; Greensboro, NC
NCAA tournament
March 11*		vs. St. John's; NCAA tournament • second round	L 78–80	22–8	Reynolds Coliseum; Raleigh, NC
*Non-conference game. ^{#}Rankings from AP Poll. (#) Tournament seedings in parentheses.

Compiled from multiple sources

== Rankings ==
Ranking movements Legend: ██ Increase in ranking ██ Decrease in ranking — = Not ranked
	Week																
Poll	Pre	1	2	3	4	5	6	7	8	9	10	11	12	13	14	15	Final
AP	1	1	1	1	1	1	5	7	8	7	3	3	5	6	5	6	11
Coaches	1	—	—	1	1	1	7	7	9	6	4	3	6	7	6	7	Not released

^Coaches did not release week 1 or week 2 polls.
