= 1978–79 North Carolina Tar Heels men's basketball team =

American college basketball season

1978–79 North Carolina Tar Heels men's basketball

ACC Tournament champions ACC regular season champions

NCAA tournament, Second Round
- Conference: Atlantic Coast Conference

Ranking
- Coaches: No. 3
- AP: No. 9
- Record: 23–6 (9–3 ACC)
- Head coach: Dean Smith (18th season)
- Assistant coaches: Bill Guthridge (12th season); Eddie Fogler (8th season); Roy Williams (1st season)
- Home arena: Carmichael Auditorium

1978–79 ACC men's basketball standings
	Conf.				Overall
Team	W		L	PCT	W		L	PCT
No. 9 North Carolina †	9	–	3	.750	23	–	6	.793
No. 11 Duke	9	–	3	.750	22	–	8	.733
Virginia	7	–	5	.583	19	–	10	.655
Maryland	6	–	6	.500	19	–	11	.633
Clemson	5	–	7	.417	19	–	10	.655
NC State	3	–	9	.250	18	–	12	.600
Wake Forest	3	–	9	.250	12	–	15	.444
† 1979 ACC tournament winner Rankings from AP Poll

The 1978–79 North Carolina Tar Heels men's basketball team represented the University of North Carolina at Chapel Hill. The Tar Heels finished with an overall record of 23–6 (9–3 ACC) As an automatic qualifier they were a #1 seed in the 1979 NCAA Tournament. In the second round North Carolina were upset by the Ivy League Champions Penn. 72–71.

== Schedule ==
Date time, TV	Rank^{#}	Opponent^{#}	Result	Record	Site city, state
Regular season
November 29*	No. 14	at Northwestern	W 97–67	1–0	Welsh–Ryan Arena; Evanston, IL
December 1*	No. 14	vs. Wake Forest; Big Four Tournament	W 73–55	2–0	Greensboro Coliseum; Greensboro, NC
December 2*	No. 14	vs. No. 1 Duke; Big Four Tournament	L 68–78	2–1	Greensboro Coliseum; Greensboro, NC
December 4*	No. 14	Detroit	W 93–76	3–1	Carmichael Auditorium; Chapel Hill, NC
December 9*	No. 14	Jacksonville	W 85–56	4–1	Carmichael Auditorium; Chapel Hill, NC
December 16*	No. 13	No. 3 Michigan State	W 70–69	5–1	Carmichael Auditorium; Chapel Hill, NC
December 22*	No. 6	at Cincinnati	W 62–59	6–1	Riverfront Coliseum; Cincinnati, OH
December 29*	No. 5	vs. Dartmouth; Kodak Classic	W 86–67	7–1	War Memorial Coliseum; Rochester, NY
December 30*	No. 5	vs. Niagara; Kodak Classic	W 121–69	8–1	War Memorial Coliseum; Rochester, NY
January 3	No. 5	vs. Clemson	W 90–68	9–1 (1–0)	Greensboro Coliseum; Greensboro, NC
January 6	No. 3	Virginia	W 86–74 ^{2OT}	10–1 (2–0)	Carmichael Auditorium; Chapel Hill, NC
January 10	No. 3	at Wake Forest	L 56–59	10–2 (2–1)	Winston–Salem Memorial Coliseum; Winston-Salem, NC
January 13	No. 3	No. 7 Duke	W 74–68	11–2 (3–1)	Carmichael Auditorium; Chapel Hill, NC
January 14*	No. 3	vs. No. 10 Arkansas	W 63–57	12–2	Greensboro Coliseum; Greensboro, NC
January 17	No. 2	at No. 14 NC State	W 70–69	13–2 (4–1)	Reynolds Coliseum; Raleigh, NC
January 20	No. 2	at No. 19 Maryland	W 54–53	14–2 (5–1)	Cole Fieldhouse; College Park, MD
January 25	No. 2	Wake Forest	W 76–69	15–2 (6–1)	Carmichael Auditorium; Chapel Hill, NC
January 27	No. 2	at Clemson	L 61–66	15–3 (6–2)	Littlejohn Coliseum; Clemson, SC
February 2*	No. 4	vs. Furman; North-South Doubleheader	L 70–83	15–4	Charlotte Coliseum; Charlotte, NC
February 3*	No. 4	vs. Virginia Tech; North-South Doubleheader	W 92–80 ^{OT}	16–4	Charlotte Coliseum; Charlotte, NC
February 7	No. 6	Maryland	W 76–67	17–4 (7–2)	Carmichael Auditorium; Chapel Hill, NC
February 10*	No. 6	vs. Providence	W 89–55	18–4	Charlotte Coliseum; Charlotte, NC
February 14*	No. 4	William & Mary	W 85–60	19–4	Carmichael Auditorium; Chapel Hill, NC
February 17	No. 4	at Virginia	W 66–57	20–4 (8–2)	University Hall; Charlottesville, VA
February 22	No. 4	NC State	W 71–56	21–4 (9–2)	Carmichael Auditorium; Chapel Hill, NC
February 24	No. 4	at No. 6 Duke	L 40–47	21–5 (9–3)	Cameron Indoor Stadium; Durham, NC
ACC Tournament
March 2*	(1) No. 7	vs. (4) Maryland; Semifinals	W 102–79	22–5	Greensboro Coliseum; Greensboro, NC
March 3*	(1) No. 7	vs. (2) No. 5 Duke; Championship	W 71–63	23–5	Greensboro Coliseum; Greensboro, NC
NCAA Tournament
March 11*	(1 E) No. 3	vs. (9 E) Pennsylvania; NCAA tournament	L 71–72	23–6	Reynolds Coliseum; Raleigh, NC
*Non-conference game. ^{#}Rankings from AP Poll. (#) Tournament seedings in parentheses. E=East.

== Rankings ==
Ranking movements Legend: ██ Increase in ranking ██ Decrease in ranking — = Not ranked
	Week																
Poll	Pre	1	2	3	4	5	6	7	8	9	10	11	12	13	14	15	Final
AP	16	14	14	13	6	5	3	3	2	2	4	6	4	4	7	3	9
Coaches	12	—	—	12	6	6	4	4	3	2	6	6	4	4	7	3	Not released

^Coaches did not release Week 1 or Week 2 polls.
