= 1978–79 Boise State Broncos men's basketball team =

American college basketball season

1978–79 Boise State Broncos men's basketball
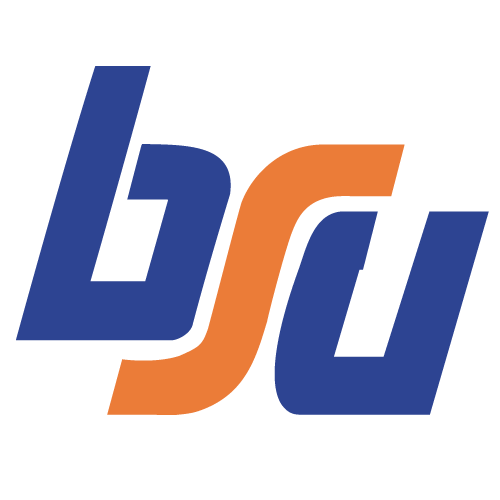
- Conference: Big Sky Conference
- Record: 11–15 (6–8 Big Sky)
- Head coach: Bus Connor (6th season)
- Home arena: Bronco Gymnasium

1978–79 Big Sky men's basketball standings
	Conf.				Overall
Team	W		L	PCT	W		L	PCT
Weber State †	10	–	4	.714	25	–	9	.735
Northern Arizona	8	–	6	.571	14	–	14	.500
Idaho State	8	–	6	.571	14	–	13	.519
Montana	7	–	7	.500	14	–	13	.519
Gonzaga	7	–	7	.500	16	–	10	.615
Montana State	6	–	8	.429	15	–	11	.577
Boise State	6	–	8	.429	11	–	15	.423
Idaho	4	–	10	.286	11	–	15	.423
† Big Sky Conference tournament winner

The 1978–79 Boise State Broncos men's basketball team represented Boise State University during the 1978–79 NCAA Division I men's basketball season. The Broncos were led by sixth-year head coach Bus Connor and played their home games on campus at Bronco Gymnasium in Boise, Idaho.

They finished the regular season at 11–15 overall, with a 6–8 record in the Big Sky Conference, tied for sixth in the standings.

No Broncos were named to the all-conference team; forward Sean McKenna was on the second team, and guard Fred Williams was honorable mention.
