= 1979 NCAA Division I basketball tournament =

Edition of USA college basketball tournament

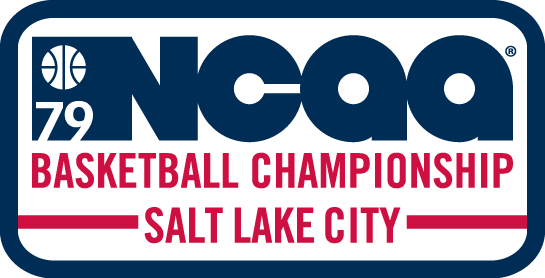
- Season: 1978–79
- Teams: 40
- Finals site: Special Events Center, Salt Lake City, Utah
- Champions: Michigan State Spartans (1st title, 1st title game, 2nd Final Four)
- Runner-up: Indiana State Sycamores (1st title game, 1st Final Four)
- Semifinalists: DePaul Blue Demons (2nd Final Four); Penn Quakers (1st Final Four)
- Winning coach: Jud Heathcote (1st title)
- MOP: Magic Johnson (Michigan State)
- Attendance: 262,101
- Top scorer: Tony Price (Penn) (142 points)

The 1979 NCAA Division I basketball tournament involved 40 schools playing in single-elimination play to determine the national champion of men's NCAA Division I college basketball. The 41st annual edition of the tournament began on March 9, and ended with the championship game on March 26, at the Special Events Center on the campus of the University of Utah in Salt Lake City. A total of 40 games were played, including a national third-place game. This was the tournament's only edition with 40 teams; the previous year's had 32, and it expanded to 48 in 1980. The 1979 Indiana State team was the last squad to reach a national title game with an undefeated record for 42 years; their achievement was finally matched by the 2021 Gonzaga Bulldogs, who reached that year's title contest against Baylor with a 31–0 record.

Michigan State, coached by Jud Heathcote, won the national title with a 75–64 victory in the final game over Indiana State, coached by Bill Hodges. Indiana State came into the game undefeated, but could not extend their winning streak. Magic Johnson of Michigan State was named the tournament's Most Outstanding Player. Michigan State's victory over Indiana State was its first over a top-ranked team, and remained its only victory over a number one ranked team until 2007 (Wisconsin).

The final game marked the beginning of the rivalry between future Hall of Famers Johnson and Larry Bird. As of 2021, it remains the highest-rated game in the history of televised college basketball. Both Johnson and Bird would enter the NBA in the fall of 1979, and the rivalry between them and their teams (respectively, the Los Angeles Lakers and Boston Celtics) was a major factor in the league's renaissance in the 1980s and 1990s. The game also led to the "modern era" of college basketball, as it introduced a nationwide audience to a sport that was once relegated to second-class status in the sports world. This was also the first tournament where unique logos for the event were introduced, creating a diversity of branding which lasts to the present day.

With the loss in the championship game, Indiana State has finished as the national runner-up in the NAIA (1946, 1948), NCAA Division II (1968), and NCAA Division I (1979) tournaments, making them the only school to do so.

This was the first tournament in which all teams were seeded by the Division I Basketball Committee. The top six seeds in each regional received byes to the second round, while seeds 7–10 played in the first round.

It is also notable as the last Final Four played in an on-campus arena, at the University of Utah. (The most recent tournament to be held on a university's premises (i.e. not on the university's main campus, but on a satellite or branch campus) was in 1983, as the University of New Mexico (UNM) hosted that year's tournament in The Pit (then officially known as University Arena), which is located on the UNM South Campus.) It has, however, been played in a team's regular off-campus home arena three times since then: in 1985 at Rupp Arena, Kentucky's home court, in 1994 at Charlotte Coliseum, UNCC's home court, and in 1996 at Continental Airlines Arena, then Seton Hall's home court. Given the use of domed stadiums for Final Fours for the foreseeable future, it is likely this will be the last Final Four on a college campus. This tournament was the last until the 2019 tournament to see two finalists playing for the national championship for the first time. The 1979 Final Four was the first in which all four schools came from east of the Mississippi River.

This was the first NCAA tournament where three officials were assigned to all games. Several conferences, including the Big Ten and Southeastern, used three officials for its regular season games prior to the NCAA adopting it universally.

== Schedule and venues ==
1979 sites for first and second round games
1979 Regionals (blue) and Final Four (red)

The following are the sites that were selected to host each round of the 1979 tournament:

First and Second Rounds

- March 9 and 11
  - East Region
    - Reynolds Coliseum, Raleigh, North Carolina (Host: North Carolina State University)
  - Mideast Region
    - Murphy Center, Murfreesboro, Tennessee (Host: Middle Tennessee State University)
  - Midwest Region
    - Allen Fieldhouse, Lawrence, Kansas (Host: University of Kansas)
  - West Region
    - Pauley Pavilion, Los Angeles, California (Host: UCLA)
- March 10 (second round only)
  - East Region
    - Providence Civic Center, Providence, Rhode Island (Host: Providence College)
  - Mideast Region
    - Assembly Hall, Bloomington, Indiana (Host: Indiana University Bloomington)
  - Midwest Region
    - Moody Coliseum, Dallas, Texas (Host: Southern Methodist University)
  - West Region
    - McKale Center, Tucson, Arizona (Host: University of Arizona)

Regional semifinals and finals (Sweet Sixteen and Elite Eight)

- March 15 and 17
  - Midwest Regional, Riverfront Coliseum, Cincinnati, Ohio (Hosts: University of Cincinnati, Xavier University)
  - West Regional, Marriott Center, Provo, Utah (Host: Brigham Young University)
- March 16 and 18
  - East Regional, Greensboro Memorial Coliseum, Greensboro, North Carolina (Host: Atlantic Coast Conference)
  - Mideast Regional, Market Square Arena, Indianapolis, Indiana (Host: Butler University)

National semifinals, 3rd-place game, and championship (Final Four and championship)

- March 24 and 26
  - Special Events Center, Salt Lake City, Utah (Host: University of Utah)

== Tournament notes ==
In the East, the Round of 32 was called Black Sunday because of Penn's upset of number 1 North Carolina and St. John's upset of number 2-seeded Duke, both in Raleigh, NC. Both victors, the lowest two seeds, achieved upsets again in the next round with #9 Penn defeating #4 Syracuse and #10 St. John's winning over #6 Rutgers, to make the regional final. Penn won 64–62 to reach the Final Four before losing to eventual champion Michigan State. Both teams had to defeat higher-seeded opponents in the Round of 40 to have the chance to beat UNC and Duke. Penn beat three higher-seeded opponents to reach the Final Four, a feat which was later bettered in 1986 by LSU, 2006 by George Mason, and 2011 by Virginia Commonwealth, who each beat four higher-seeded opponents on the way to the Final Four.

== Teams ==
Region	Seed	Team	Coach	Conference	Finished	Final Opponent	Score
East
East	1	North Carolina	Dean Smith	Atlantic Coast	Round of 32	9 Penn	L 72–71
East	2	Duke	Bill E. Foster	Atlantic Coast	Round of 32	10 St. John's	L 80–78
East	3	Georgetown	John Thompson	Independent	Round of 32	6 Rutgers	L 64–58
East	4	Syracuse	Jim Boeheim	Independent	Sweet Sixteen	9 Penn	L 84–76
East	5	Connecticut	Dom Perno	Independent	Round of 32	4 Syracuse	L 89–81
East	6	Rutgers	Tom Young	Eastern Athletic	Sweet Sixteen	10 St. John's	L 67–65
East	7	Temple	Don Casey	East Coast	Round of 40	10 St. John's	L 75–70
East	8	Iona	Jim Valvano	Independent	Round of 40	9 Penn	L 73–69
East	9	Penn	Bob Weinhauer	Ivy League	Fourth Place	2 Michigan State	L 101–67
East	10	St. John's	Lou Carnesecca	New Jersey-New York 7	Regional Runner-up	9 Penn	L 64–62
Mideast
Mideast	1	Notre Dame	Digger Phelps	Independent	Regional Runner-up	2 Michigan State	L 80–68
Mideast	2	Michigan State	Jud Heathcote	Big Ten	Champion	1 Indiana State	W 75–64
Mideast	3	LSU	Dale Brown	Southeastern	Sweet Sixteen	2 Michigan State	L 87–71
Mideast	4	Iowa	Lute Olson	Big Ten	Round of 32	5 Toledo	L 74–72
Mideast	5	Toledo	Bob Nichols	Mid-American	Sweet Sixteen	1 Notre Dame	L 79–71
Mideast	6	Appalachian State	Bobby Cremins	Southern	Round of 32	3 LSU	L 71–57
Mideast	7	Detroit	Smokey Gaines	Independent	Round of 40	10 Lamar	L 95–87
Mideast	8	Tennessee	Don DeVoe	Southeastern	Round of 32	1 Notre Dame	L 73–67
Mideast	9	Eastern Kentucky	Ed Byhre	Ohio Valley	Round of 40	8 Tennessee	L 97–81
Mideast	10	Lamar	Billy Tubbs	Southland	Round of 32	2 Michigan State	L 95–64
Midwest
Midwest	1	Indiana State	Bill Hodges	Missouri Valley	Runner Up	2 Michigan State	L 75–64
Midwest	2	Arkansas	Eddie Sutton	Southwest	Regional Runner-up	1 Indiana State	L 73–71
Midwest	3	Louisville	Denny Crum	Metro	Sweet Sixteen	2 Arkansas	L 73–62
Midwest	4	Texas	Abe Lemons	Southwest	Round of 32	5 Oklahoma	L 90–76
Midwest	5	Oklahoma	Dave Bliss	Big Eight	Sweet Sixteen	1 Indiana State	L 93–72
Midwest	6	South Alabama	Cliff Ellis	Sun Belt	Round of 32	3 Louisville	L 69–66
Midwest	7	Weber State	Neil McCarthy	Big Sky	Round of 32	2 Arkansas	L 74–63
Midwest	8	Virginia Tech	Charles Moir	Metro	Round of 32	1 Indiana State	L 86–69
Midwest	9	Jacksonville	Tates Locke	Sun Belt	Round of 40	8 Virginia Tech	L 70–53
Midwest	10	New Mexico State	Ken Hayes	Missouri Valley	Round of 40	7 Weber State	L 81–78
West
West	1	UCLA	Gary Cunningham	Pacific-10	Regional Runner-up	2 DePaul	L 95–91
West	2	DePaul	Ray Meyer	Independent	Third Place	1 Indiana State	L 76–74
West	3	Marquette	Hank Raymonds	Independent	Sweet Sixteen	2 DePaul	L 62–56
West	4	San Francisco	Dan Belluomini	West Coast	Sweet Sixteen	1 UCLA	L 99–81
West	5	BYU	Frank Arnold	Western Athletic	Round of 32	4 San Francisco	L 86–63
West	6	Pacific	Stan Morrison	Pacific Coast	Round of 32	3 Marquette	L 73–48
West	7	USC	Bob Boyd	Pacific-10	Round of 32	2 DePaul	L 89–78
West	8	Utah	Jerry Pimm	Western Athletic	Round of 40	9 Pepperdine	L 92–88
West	9	Pepperdine	Gary Colson	West Coast	Round of 32	1 UCLA	L 76–71
West	10	Utah State	Rod Tueller	Pacific Coast	Round of 40	7 USC	L 86–67

== Bracket ==
* – Denotes overtime period

=== East region ===
First round
7	Temple	70
10	St. John's	75
8	Iona	69
9	Penn	73

Quarter-finals
10	St. John's	80
2	Duke	78
3	Georgetown	58
6	Rutgers	64
9	Penn	72
1	North Carolina	71
4	Syracuse	89
5	Connecticut	81

Regional semifinals
10	St. John's	67
6	Rutgers	65
9	Penn	84
4	Syracuse	76

Regional Finals
10	St. John's	62
9	Penn	64

=== Mideast region ===
First round
7	Detroit	87
10	Lamar	95
8	Tennessee	97
9	Eastern Kentucky	81

Quarter-finals
10	Lamar	64
2	Michigan State	95
3	LSU	71
6	Appalachian State	57
8	Tennessee	67
1	Notre Dame	73
4	Iowa	72
5	Toledo	74

Regional semifinals
2	Michigan State	87
3	LSU	71
1	Notre Dame	79
5	Toledo	71

Regional Finals
2	Michigan State	80
1	Notre Dame	68

=== Midwest region ===
First round
7	Weber State	81
10	New Mexico State	78
8	Virginia Tech	70
9	Jacksonville	53

Quarter-finals
7	Weber State	63
2	Arkansas	74
3	Louisville	69
6	South Alabama	66
8	Virginia Tech	69
1	Indiana State	86
4	Texas	76
5	Oklahoma	90

Regional semifinals
2	Arkansas	73
3	Louisville	62
1	Indiana State	93
5	Oklahoma	72

Regional Finals
2	Arkansas	71
1	Indiana State	73

=== West region ===
First round
7	USC	86
10	Utah State	67
8	Utah	88*
9	Pepperdine	92

Quarter-finals
7	USC	78
2	DePaul	89
3	Marquette	73
6	Pacific	48
9	Pepperdine	71
1	UCLA	76
4	San Francisco	86
5	BYU	63

Regional semifinals
2	DePaul	62
3	Marquette	56
1	UCLA	99
4	San Francisco	81

Regional Finals
2	DePaul	95
1	UCLA	91

=== Final Four ===
National semifinals Saturday, March 24
E9	Penn	67
ME2	Michigan State	101
MW1	Indiana State	76
W2	DePaul	74

National Championship Game; Monday, March 26
ME2	Michigan State	75
MW1	Indiana State	64
National third-place game
E9	Penn	93
W2	DePaul	96

== Announcers ==
- Dick Enberg, Billy Packer, and Al McGuire – Final Four at Salt Lake City, Utah
- Dick Enberg and Al McGuire – Second Round at Providence, Rhode Island (Georgetown–Rutgers, Syracuse–Connecticut); Second Round at Murfreesboro, Tennessee (Michigan State–Lamar, Notre Dame–Tennessee); Mideast Regional Final at Indianapolis, Indiana; West Regional Final at Provo, Utah
- Jim Simpson and Billy Packer – Second Round at Tucson, Arizona (San Francisco–Brigham Young, Marquette–Pacific); Second Round at Lawrence, Kansas (Indiana State–Virginia Tech, Arkansas–Weber State); East Regional Final at Greensboro, North Carolina; Midwest Regional Final at Cincinnati, Ohio
- Jay Randolph and Gary Thompson – Midwest Regional semifinals at Cincinnati, Ohio
- Connie Alexander and Bill Strannigan – West Regional semifinals at Provo, Utah
- Marv Albert and Bucky Waters – Second Round at Raleigh, North Carolina (North Carolina–Pennsylvania, Duke–St. John's)
- Merle Harmon and Fred Taylor – Second Round at Bloomington, Indiana (Iowa–Toledo, LSU–Appalachian State)
- Jim Thacker and Gary Thompson – Second Round at Dallas, Texas (Louisville–South Alabama, Texas–Oklahoma)
- Jay Randolph and Lynn Shackelford – Second Round at Los Angeles, California (UCLA–Pepperdine, DePaul–USC)

== See also ==
- 1979 NCAA Division II basketball tournament
- 1979 NCAA Division III basketball tournament
- 1979 National Invitation Tournament
- 1979 NAIA basketball tournament
- 1979 National Women's Invitation Tournament
