= Gary Colson =

American basketball coach and executive (1934–2023)

Biographical details
- Born: April 30, 1934; Logansport, Indiana, U.S.
- Died: November 3, 2023 (aged 89); Santa Barbara, California, U.S.

Playing career
- 1953–1956: David Lipscomb

Coaching career (HC unless noted)
- 1958–1968: Valdosta State
- 1968–1979: Pepperdine
- 1980–1988: New Mexico
- 1990–1995: Fresno State

Accomplishments and honors

Championships
- WCAC regular season (1976)

Awards
- WCAC Coach of the Year (1976); WAC Coach of the Year (1984)

Gary Colson (April 30, 1934 – November 3, 2023) was an American basketball coach and executive. The Logansport, Indiana, native guided several college men's basketball teams, including Valdosta State University, Pepperdine University, University of New Mexico and California State University, Fresno. He compiled a 563–385 (.594) record over 34 seasons of coaching between 1959 and 1995. In 2002, he joined the Memphis Grizzlies' front office as Assistant to the President of Basketball Operations. In his later years, Coach Colson was a basketball instructor at the University of California, Santa Barbara. Coach Colson earned his bachelor's degree in health and physical education from David Lipscomb College (now Lipscomb University) in 1956. He was inducted into the Lipscomb Athletics Hall of Fame in 1998 in the "Athlete" category.

Colson died from lymphoma in Santa Barbara, California, on November 3, 2023, at the age of 89.
