= Bob Boyd (basketball) =

Former collegiate men's basketball coach

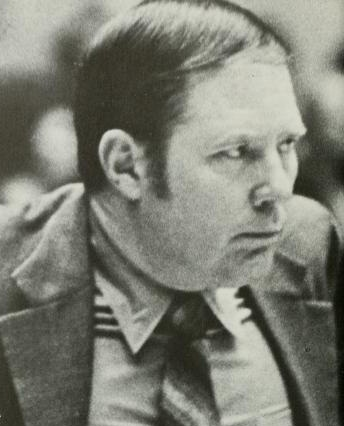
Boyd, c. 1971

William Robert Boyd (June 7, 1930 – January 14, 2015) was an American collegiate men's basketball coach who was head coach at Seattle University, the University of Southern California (USC) and Mississippi State University.

== Playing career & high school coaching ==
Boyd had a long association with the University of Southern California's men's basketball, first as a player and then as its head coach. The 3-year letterman (1950–52) was USC's most valuable player as a senior in 1952. Boyd then began his coaching career, first for five years in the high school ranks (at El Segundo, California and Alhambra, California).

== College coach ==
For six years, Boyd coached men's basketball at the junior college level at Santa Ana College (his 1959 team finished second at the state tournament). Later, he joined the college ranks, first at Seattle University, where Boyd went 41–13 in 2 seasons (1963–65).

After a year out of coaching while working for Converse athletic shoes, Boyd embarked on a 13-year career (1967–79) as the head coach of the USC basketball team.

Boyd's Trojans went 216–131 overall and played in the post-season four times (the 1979 NCAA tournament, 1973 NIT and 1974 and 1975 Commissioner's Conference tourney). Boyd's 1971 team, which went 24–2 and was ranked fifth in the nation (USC was ranked first at midseason), is regarded among USC's best (Boyd also won 24 games in 1974).

=== Rivalry with UCLA and players ===
Boyd's wins over UCLA in 1969 and 1970 were the UCLA's first losses in Pauley Pavilion, built in 1966. Boyd was twice named the conference Coach of the Year. Boyd sent ten players into the NBA, including Paul Westphal and Gus Williams.

== After USC ==
Boyd went on to be the head coach at Mississippi State University (1982–86), Riverside Community College (1989) and Chapman University (1990–92), and then was an assistant at LSU and Utah State University.

== Legacy and death ==
Boyd was a member of the University of Southern California's Athletic Hall of Fame and the Pac-12 Conference Men's Basketball Hall of Honor.

Boyd died of natural causes in Palm Desert, California on January 14, 2015, aged 84.

=== Quote ===
"Boyd labored quietly and effectively for the Trojans — much more effectively than most people realize," wrote Steve Bisheff. "The truth is, Boyd was the best USC basketball coach of the modern era, if not any era... The only thing wrong was his timing. He just happened to coach in the same town, at the same time, as a college basketball icon.
