= List of Western Kentucky Hilltoppers basketball seasons =

This is season-by-season results for the Western Kentucky Hilltoppers basketball team.

== Season-by-season results ==
Statistics overview
Season	Team	Overall	Conference	Standing	Postseason
**Coach J.L. Arthur** (Independent) (1914–1916)
1914–15	Western Kentucky State; Normal School	5–1			
1915–16	WKS	2–1			
J.L.Arthur:		7–2 (.875)			
**No Team** (World War I) (1916–1921)
**Coach L.T. Smith** (Independent) (1921–1922)
1921–22	Western Kentucky State; Normal School and Teachers College	3–1			
L.T.Smith:		3–1 (.750)			
**Coach E. A. Diddle** (Independent) (1922–1926)
1922–23	WKS	12–2			
1923–24	WKS	9–9			
1924–25	WKS	8–6			
1925–26	WKS	10–4			
**Coach E. A. Diddle** (Kentucky Intercollegiate Athletic Conference and Southern Intercollegiate Athletic Association) (1926–1948)
1926–27	WKS	12–7			
1927–28	WKS	10–7			
1928–29	WKS	8–10			
1929–30	WKS	4–12			
1930–31	WKS	11–3			
1931–32	WKS	15–8		1st KIAC	
1932–33	WKS	16–6		1st KIAC	
1933–34	WKS	**28**–8		1st KIAC 1st SIAA	
1934–35	WKS	**24**–3		1st KIAC	
1935–36	WKS	**26**–4		1st KIAC	National Olympic Playoffs
1936–37	WKS	21–2		1st KIAC 1st SIAA	
1937–38	WKS	**30**–3		1st KIAC 1st SIAA	NIBT (withdrew/forfeit)
1938–39	WKS	22–3		1st KIAC 1st SIAA	
1939–40	WKS	24–6		1st KIAC 1st SIAA	NCAA Elite 8
1940–41	WKS	22–4		1st SIAA	
1941–42	WKS	**29**–5		1st KIAC 1st SIAA	NIT Runner Up
1942–43	WKS	24–3		1st KIAC	NIT Quarterfinals
1943–44	WKS	13–9			
1944–45	WKS	17–10			
1945–46	WKS	15–19			
1946–47	WKS	25–4		1st KIAC 1st SIAA	
1947–48	Western Kentucky State; College	28–2		1st KIAC; NCAA Annual Team; Champions	NIT 3rd place
**Coach E. A. Diddle** (Ohio Valley Conference) (1948–1964)
1948–49	WKSC	25–4	8–2	1st	NIT Quarterfinals
1949–50	WKSC	25–6	8–0	1st	NIT Quarterfinals
1950–51	WKSC	19–10	4–4	4th	NCBT 1st Round
1951–52	WKSC	26–5	11–1	1st	NIT Quarterfinals
1952–53	WKSC	25–6	8–2	2nd	NIT Quarterfinals
1953–54	WKSC	**29**–3	9–1	1st	NIT 4th Place
1954–55	WKSC	18–10	8–2	1st	
1955–56	WKSC	16–12	7–3	T–1st	
1956–57	WKSC	17–9	9–1	T–1st	
1957–58	WKSC	14–11	5–5	3rd	
1958–59	WKSC	16–10	8–4	2nd	
1959–60	WKSC	21–7	10–2	1st	NCAA Sweet Sixteen
1960–61	WKSC	18–8	9–3	T–1st	
1961–62	WKSC	17–10	11–1	1st	NCAA Sweet Sixteen
1962–63	WKSC	5–16	3–9	7th	
1963–64	WKSC	5–16	3–11	8th	
E. A. Diddle:		759–302 (.715)	121–51		
**Coach John Oldham** (Ohio Valley Conference) (1964–1971)
1964–65	WKSC	18–9	10–4	2nd	NIT Quarterfinals
1965–66	Western Kentucky; University	25–3	14–0	1st	NCAA Sweet Sixteen
1966–67	WKU	23–3	13–1	1st	NCAA round of 23
1967–68	WKU	18–7	9–5	3rd	
1968–69	WKU	16–10	9–5	3rd	
1969–70	WKU	22–3	14–0	1st	NCAA round of 25
1970–71	WKU	24–6	12–2	1st	NCAA Final Four *
John Oldham:		142–40 (.780)	81–17		
**Coach Jim Richards** (Ohio Valley Conference) (1971–1978)
1971–72	WKU	15–11	9–5	T–1st	
1972–73	WKU	10–16	6–8	6th	(NCAA Probation)
1973–74	WKU	15–10	8–6	4th	(NCAA Probation)
1974–75	WKU	16–8	11–3	2nd	(NCAA Probation)
1975–76	WKU	20–9	11–3	1st	NCAA round of 32
1976–77	WKU	10–16	6–8	T–5th	
1977–78	WKU	16–14	9–5	T–3rd	NCAA Sweet Sixteen
Jim Richards:		102–84 (.548)	60–38		
**Coach Gene Keady** (Ohio Valley Conference) (1978–1980)
1978–79	WKU	17–11	7–5	T–2nd	
1979–80	WKU	21–8	10–2	T–1st	NCAA round of 48
Gene Keady:		38–19 (.667)	17–7		
**Coach Clem Haskins** (Ohio Valley Conference) (1980–1982)
1980–81	WKU	21–8	12–2	1st	NCAA round of 48
1981–82	WKU	19–10	13–3	T–1st	NIT 1st Round
**Coach Clem Haskins** (Sun Belt Conference) (1982–1986)
1982–83	WKU	12–16	4–10	7th	
1983–84	WKU	12–17	5–9	6th	
1984–85	WKU	14–14	5–9	7th	
1985–86	WKU	23–8	10–4	2nd	NCAA round of 32
Clem Haskins:		101–73 (.580)	49–37		
**Coach Murray Arnold** (Sun Belt Conference) (1986–1990)
1986–87	WKU	29–9	12–2	1st	NCAA round of 32
1987–88	WKU	15–13	6–8	6th	
1988–89	WKU	14–15	4–10	7th	
1989–90	WKU	13–17	7–7	T–3rd	
Murray Arnold:		71–54 (.568)	29–27		
**Coach Ralph Willard** (Sun Belt Conference) (1990–1994)
1990–91	WKU	14–14	8–6	T–3rd	
1991–92	WKU	21–11	10–6	4th	NIT 1st Round
1992–93	WKU	26–6	14–4	2nd	NCAA Sweet Sixteen
1993–94	WKU	20–11	14–4	1st	NCAA round of 64
Ralph Willard:		81–42 (.667)	46–20		
**Coach Matt Kilcullen** (Sun Belt Conference) (1994–1998)
1994–95	WKU	27–4	17–1	1st	NCAA round of 32
1995–96	WKU	13–14	10–8	T–3rd	
1996–97	WKU	12–15	9–9	T–6th	
1997–98	WKU	7–16	4–10	–	–
Matt Kilcullen:		59–49 (.546)	42–30		
**Ron Brown and Al Seibert (named co-Head Coaches for last 6 games)** (Sun Belt Conference) (1998–1998)
1997–98	WKU	3–3	2–2	T–8th	
Ron Brown and Al Seibert:		3–3 (.500)	2–2		
**Coach Dennis Felton** (Sun Belt Conference) (1998–2003)
1998–99	WKU	13–16	7–7	T–3rd	
1999–00	WKU	11–18	8–8	5th	
2000–01	WKU	24–7	14–2	1st (East)	NCAA round of 64
2001–02	WKU	28–4	13–1	1st (East)	NCAA round of 64
2002–03	WKU	24–9	12–2	1st (East)	NCAA round of 64
Dennis Felton:		100–54 (.649)	54–20 (.730)		
**Coach Darrin Horn** (Sun Belt Conference) (2003–2008)
2003–04	WKU	15–13	8–6	5th	
2004–05	WKU	22–9	9–5	2nd (East)	NIT 2nd Round
2005–06	WKU	23–8	12–2	1st (East)	NIT 1st Round
2006–07	WKU	22–11	12–6	2nd (East)	
2007–08	WKU	29–7	16–2	T–1st (East)	NCAA Sweet Sixteen
Darrin Horn:		111–48 (.698)	57–21 (.731)		
**Coach Ken McDonald** (Sun Belt Conference) (2008–2012)
2008–09	WKU	25–8	15–3	1st (East)	NCAA round of 32
2009–10	WKU	21–13	12–6	3rd (East)	
2010–11	WKU	16–16	8–8	3rd (East)	
2011–12	WKU	5–11	1–2	–	–
Ken McDonald:		67–48 (.583)	36–19 (.655)		
**Ray Harper (named interim Head Coach after 16 games)** (Sun Belt Conference) (2012–2014)
2011–12	WKU	11–8	10–7	T–3rd (East)	NCAA round of 64
2012–13	WKU	20–16	10–10	4th (East)	NCAA round of 64
2013–14	WKU	21–11	12–6	2nd	
**Coach Ray Harper** (Conference USA) (2014–2016)
2014–15	WKU	20–12	12–6	4th	
2015–16	WKU	18–16	8–10	8th	
Ray Harper:		90–63 (.588)	42–34 (.553)		
**Coach Rick Stansbury** (Conference USA) (2016–2023)
2016–17	WKU	15–17	9–9	8th	
2017–18	WKU	27–11	14–4	3rd	NIT Final Four
2018–19	WKU	20–14	11–7	2nd	
2019–20	WKU	20–10	13–5	2nd	(Tournaments cancelled)
2020–21	WKU	21–8	11-3	1st (East)	NIT Quarterfinals
2021–22	WKU	19–13	11-7	2nd (East)	
2022–23	WKU	17–16	8-12	6th	Stansbury missed 9 games with health issues. Phil Cunningham coached the team during those games winning 3 and losing 6.
Rick Stansbury:		136–83 (.621)	74–41 (.643)		
**Coach Steve Lutz** (Conference USA) (2023–2024)
2023–24	WKU	22–12	8–8	3rd	NCAA round of 64
Steve Lutz:		22–12 (.647)	8–8 (.500)		
**Coach Hank Plona** (Conference USA) (2024–present)
2024–25	WKU	17–15	8–10	7th	
2025–26	WKU	18–14	11–9	T–3rd	
Hank Plona:		35–29 (.547)	19–19 (.500)		
Total:		1930–1011 (.656)			
National champion Postseason invitational champion Conference regular season champion Conference regular season and conference tournament champion Division regular season champion Division regular season and conference tournament champion Conference tournament champion

BOLD indicates lead the NCAA in victories.
NCAA – National Collegiate Athletic Association
NIT – National Invitation Tournament
NCBT – National Campus Basketball Tournament
NIBT – National Intercollegiate Basketball tournament
* 1971 NCAA appearance, including 4 tournament wins, vacated by the NCAA

== Rankings ==
The Associated Press (AP) began publishing a national college basketball poll during the 1948–49 season. The Coaches Poll began during the 1950–51 season. The highest that Western Kentucky has been ranked in the AP poll is number 3 (1949, 1954, and 1967); the highest they have been ranked in the Coaches poll is 4th in 1954. The AP poll was a top 20 poll from 1949 to 1960; a top 10 poll from 1961 to 1968; a top 20 from 1969 to 1989; and a top 25 poll since 1990. The Coaches poll started as a top 20 poll in 1950 and remained such until 1991 when it became a top 25 poll. Below is the team's highest ranking and final season ranking for each poll (it does not include times when Western Kentucky was listed as “receiving votes”).

Season	AP High	AP Final	Coach High	Coach Final
1948-49	3	5	N/A	N/A
1949-50	7	8	N/A	N/A
1950-51			13	
1951-52	11		16	16
1952-53	8	17	11	11
1953-54	3	8	4	6
1954-55	20			
1956-57	12		10	
1957-58	16			
1959-60	18			
1960-61			19	
1965-66	10	10	14	
1966-67	3	6	5	7
1967-68			16	
1968-69	15		14	
1969-70	12	18	15	17
1970-71	5	7	5	7
1985-86	19			
1986-87	8		10	
1992-93	20	20	16	16
1993-94	25			
1994-95	21	21		
2001-02	17	19	18	
2002-03	19		23	
2007-08			22	22
