= 1939–40 Western Kentucky State Teachers Hilltoppers basketball team =

American college basketball season

1939–40 Western Kentucky State Teachers Hilltoppers basketball

SIAA Champions KAIC Champions

NCAA Tournament, Elite Eight
- Conference: Kentucky Intercollegiate Athletic Conference
- Record: 24–6 (7–2 KIAC)
- Head coach: Edgar Diddle (18th season)
- Assistant coach: Ted Hornback
- Home arena: Health & Physical Education Building

The 1939–40 Western Kentucky State Teachers Hilltoppers men's basketball team represented Western Kentucky State Normal School and Teachers College (now known as Western Kentucky University) during the 1939-40 NCAA basketball season. The team was led by future Naismith Memorial Basketball Hall of Fame coach Edgar Diddle and All-American center Carlisle Towery. The Hilltoppers won the Kentucky Intercollegiate Athletic Conference and Southern Intercollegiate Athletic Association championships, and received an invitation to the 1940 NCAA basketball tournament. This was the first team from Kentucky to participate in the NCAA tournament Herb Ball and Howard “Tip” Downing were selected to the All-SIAA team, while Towery made the All-KIAC Team.

== Schedule ==
Date time, TV	Opponent	Result	Record	Site city, state
Regular Season
12/9/1939*	Culver–Stockton	W 47–35	1–0	Health & Phys Ed Building; Bowling Green, KY
12/15/1939*	at Bradley	L 38–39	1–1	Peoria Armory; Peoria, IL
12/18/1939*	at St. Ambrose	W 40–32	2–1	Davenport, IA
12/18/1939*	at Southern Illinois	L 32–38	2–2	Davies Gym; Carbondale, IL
12/19/1939*	at Southeast Missouri	W 39–33	3–2	Houck Field House; Cape Girardeau, MO
12/22/1939*	Washington and Lee	L 34–44	3–3	Lexington, VA
1/2/1940*	Xavier	W 40–39	4–3	Health & Phys Ed Building; Bowling Green, KY
1/6/1940	at Cumberland (KY)	W 40–30	5–3	Williamsburg, KY
1/8/1940*	Evansville	W 52–45	6–3	Health & Phys Ed Building; Bowling Green, KY
1/12/1940*	at Tennessee Tech	W 41–29	7–3	Memorial Gymnasium; Cookeville, TN
1/13/1940*	at Middle Tennessee	W 60–26	8–3	Murfreesboro, TN
1/17/1940	at Louisville	W 55–40	9–3	Belknap Gymnasium; Louisville, KY
1/20/1940	Murray State	W 39–30	10–3	Health & Phys Ed Building; Bowling Green, KY
1/27/1940	Eastern Kentucky	L 32–45	10–4	Health & Phys Ed Building; Bowling Green, KY
1/29/1940	Morehead State	W 44–34	11–4	Health & Phys Ed Building; Bowling Green, KY
2/2/1940	at Eastern Kentucky	W 53–33	12–4	Weaver Gymnasium; Richmond, KY
2/3/1940	at Berea	W 46–28	13–4	Berea, KY
2/6/1940*	Tennessee Tech	W 38–28	14–4	Health & Phys Ed Building; Bowling Green, KY
2/9/1940	Louisville	W 54–40	15–4	Health & Phys Ed Building; Bowling Green, KY
2/10/1940	at Murray State	L 30–36	15–5	Lovett Auditorium; Murray, KY
2/13/1940*	at Evansville	W 55–36	16–5	Evansville, IN
2/16/1940*	Vanderbilt	W 36–25	17–5	Health & Phys Ed Building; Bowling Green, KY
2/17/1940*	Middle Tennessee	W 76–41	18–5	Health & Phys Ed Building; Bowling Green, KY
1940 Kentucky Intercollegiate Athletic Conference Tournament
2/23/1940	vs. Union (KY); KIAC Tournament	W 44–39	19–5	Weaver Gymnasium; Richmond, KY
2/24/1940	vs. Georgetown (KY); KIAC Tournament Semifinal	W 45–39	20–5	Weaver Gymnasium; Richmond, KY
2/24/1940	vs. Morehead State; KIAC Tournament Final	W 36–33	21–5	Weaver Gymnasium; Richmond, KY
1940 Southern Intercollegiate Athletic Association Tournament
3/1/1940	Wofford; SIAA Tournament	W 55–21	22–5	Health & Phys Ed Building; Bowling Green, KY
3/2/1940	Murray State; SIAA Tournament Semifinal	W 25–23	23–5	Health & Phys Ed Building; Bowling Green, KY
3/2/1940	Louisiana Normal; SIAA Tournament Final	W 39–33	24–5	Health & Phys Ed Building; Bowling Green, KY
1940 NCAA basketball tournament
3/23/1940*	vs. Duquesne; NCAA Elite Eight	L 29–30	24–6	Butler Fieldhouse; Indianapolis, IN
*Non-conference game. ^{#}Rankings from AP Poll. (#) Tournament seedings in parentheses.
