= 1941–42 Western Kentucky State Teachers Hilltoppers basketball team =

American college basketball season

1941–42 Western Kentucky State Teachers Hilltoppers basketball

SIAA Champions KAIC Champions

NIT Tournament, Finals National Runner-up
- Conference: Kentucky Intercollegiate Athletic Conference
- Record: 29–5 (7–2 KIAC)
- Head coach: Edgar Diddle (20th season)
- Assistant coach: Ted Hornback
- Home arena: Health & Physical Education Building

The 1941–42 Western Kentucky State Teachers Hilltoppers men's basketball team represented Western Kentucky State Normal School and Teachers College (now known as Western Kentucky University) during the 1941-42 NCAA basketball season. The team was led by future Naismith Memorial Basketball Hall of Fame coach Edgar Diddle. The Hilltoppers won the Kentucky Intercollegiate Athletic Conference and Southern Intercollegiate Athletic Association championships, led NCAA in wins, and received an invitation to the 1942 National Invitation Tournament, where they advanced to the championship game. During this period, the NIT was considered to be the premiere college basketball tournament, with the winner being recognized as the national champion. This was the first Kentucky team to participate in the NIT. Oran McKinney, Earl Shelton, and Wallace “Buck” Sydnor were selected to the All-SIAA team, while the All-KIAC Team included Howard “Tip” Downing, Shelton, and Sydnor.

== Schedule ==
Date time, TV	Opponent	Result	Record	Site city, state
Regular Season
12/6/1941*	Camp Shelby	W 52–18	1–0	Health & Phys Ed Building; Bowling Green, KY
12/8/1941*	at Austin Peay	W 42–34	2–0	Clarksville, TN
12/13/1941*	Wichita	W 36–9	3–0	Health & Phys Ed Building; Bowling Green, KY
12/15/1941	vs. Georgetown (KY)	W 48–38	4–0	Madisonville, KY
12/18/1941*	at Southeast Missouri	W 47–36	5–0	Houck Field House; Cape Girardeau, MO
12/19/1941*	at Southern Illinois	W 48–37	6–0	Davies Gym; Carbondale, IL
12/29/1941*	Washington and Lee	W 52–24	7–0	Health & Phys Ed Building; Bowling Green, KY
1/3/1942*	vs. Illinois Wesleyan	W 60–41	8–0	Owensboro, KY
1/5/1942*	vs. Great Lakes Training	L 37–64	8–1	Jeffersonville, KY
1/7/1942*	Austin Peay	W 46–34	9–1	Health & Phys Ed Building; Bowling Green, KY
1/10/1942*	Evansville	W 69–48	10–1	Health & Phys Ed Building; Bowling Green, KY
1/17/1942	Murray State	W 29–27	11–1	Health & Phys Ed Building; Bowling Green, KY
1/21/1942*	Tennessee Tech	W 32–31	12–1	Health & Phys Ed Building; Bowling Green, KY
1/23/1942	at Morehead State	L 49–56	12–2	Button Auditorium; Morehead, KY
1/31/1942	Eastern Kentucky	W 45–31	13–2	Health & Phys Ed Building; Bowling Green, KY
2/3/1942*	at Indiana State	W 41–35	14–2	Indiana State Gym; Terre Haute, IN
2/5/1942*	at Tennessee Tech	L 34–45	14–3	Memorial Gymnasium; Cookeville, TN
2/7/1942	at Murray State	L 37–43	14–4	Lovett Auditorium; Murray, KY
2/9/1942	Morehead State	W 64–31	15–4	Health & Phys Ed Building; Bowling Green, KY
2/11/1942	at Louisville	W 62–39	16–4	Belknap Gymnasium; Louisville, KY
2/14/1942	at Eastern Kentucky	W 43–40	17–4	Weaver Gymnasium; Richmond, KY
2/16/1942*	Indiana State	W 53–48	18–4	Health & Phys Ed Building; Bowling Green, KY
2/19/1942*	at Evansville	W 41–40	19–4	Evansville, IN
2/21/1942	Union (KY)	W 59–50	20–4	Health & Phys Ed Building; Bowling Green, KY
1942 Kentucky Intercollegiate Athletic Conference Tournament
2/26/1942	vs. Murray State; KIAC Tournament	W 46–44	21–4	Weaver Gymnasium; Richmond, KY
2/27/1942	vs. Kentucky Wesleyan; KIAC Tournament Quarterfinal	W 49–41	22–4	Weaver Gymnasium; Richmond, KY
2/28/1942	vs. Berea; KIAC Tournament Semifinal	W 53–34	23–4	Weaver Gymnasium; Richmond, KY
3/1/1942	vs. Union (KY); KIAC Tournament Final	W 43–41	24–4	Weaver Gymnasium; Richmond, KY
1942 Southern Intercollegiate Athletic Association Tournament
3/6/1942	Tennessee Tech; SIAA Tournament	W 61–35	25–4	Health & Phys Ed Building; Bowling Green, KY
3/7/1942	Southwestern Louisiana; SIAA Tournament Semifinal	W 49–43	26–4	Health & Phys Ed Building; Bowling Green, KY
3/8/1942	Delta State; SIAA Tournament Final	W 49–37	27–4	Health & Phys Ed Building; Bowling Green, KY
1942 National Invitation Tournament
3/19/1942*	vs. CCNY; NIT Quarterfinal	W 49–46	28–4	Madison Square Garden; New York, NY
3/23/1942*	vs. Creighton; NIT Semifinal	W 49–38	29–4	Madison Square Garden; New York, NY
3/25/1942*	vs. West Virginia; NIT Final	L 45–47	29–5	Madison Square Garden; New York, NY
*Non-conference game. ^{#}Rankings from AP Poll. (#) Tournament seedings in parentheses.
