= List of SIAA basketball champions =

The Southern Intercollegiate Athletic Association (SIAA) was one of the earliest collegiate athletic conferences, formed in December 1894. Though many of its earliest schools departed in the 1920s to form the Southern Conference, and later the Southeastern Conference and Atlantic Coast Conference, it existed until 1942.

The first post-season college conference basketball tournament was staged in 1921 by the SIAA. In 1922 and 1923, the SIAA and Southern Conference shared a common tournament. Western Kentucky under Edgar Diddle won the last six tournaments, with three led by center Carlisle Towery. In 1947 there was an attempt, led by Western Kentucky, to revive the SIAA. Western Kentucky hosted an SIAA basketball tournament that turned out to be little more than an invitational tournament because most former SIAA members declined to participate.

Basketball was invented by James Naismith in 1891. It seemed to take off in the South in 1906, when Yale's basketball team traveled throughout the South. In 1909, continuous dribbling and shots off the dribble were allowed.

== Champions by year ==
This is an incomplete list of champions of the SIAA.

Year	Team
1906	Auburn or Nashville
1907	Auburn
1908	Auburn
1909	Georgia or Vanderbilt
1910	Central
1911	Central
1912	Mercer
1913	Mississippi A&M
1914	Georgia or Kentucky or Mississippi A&M
1915	LSU
1916	Georgia and Tennessee
1917	Georgia and LSU
1918	Georgia
1919	Centre
1920	Vanderbilt
1921	Kentucky

=== Post-Southern Conference ===
Year	Team
1922	Mercer
1923	Chattanooga
1924	Mercer
1925	Mercer
1926	Mississippi College
1927	The Citadel
1928	Mississippi College
1929	Mississippi College
1930	Louisiana-Lafayette
1931	Centenary
1932	Chattanooga and Mississippi College
1933	?
1934	Western Kentucky
1935	Millsaps
1936	Murray State
1937	Western Kentucky
1938	Western Kentucky
1939	Western Kentucky
1940	Western Kentucky
1941	Western Kentucky
1942	Western Kentucky

=== Revival ===
Year	Team
1947	Western Kentucky
