= Harold Anderson (basketball) =

American basketball coach (1902–1967)

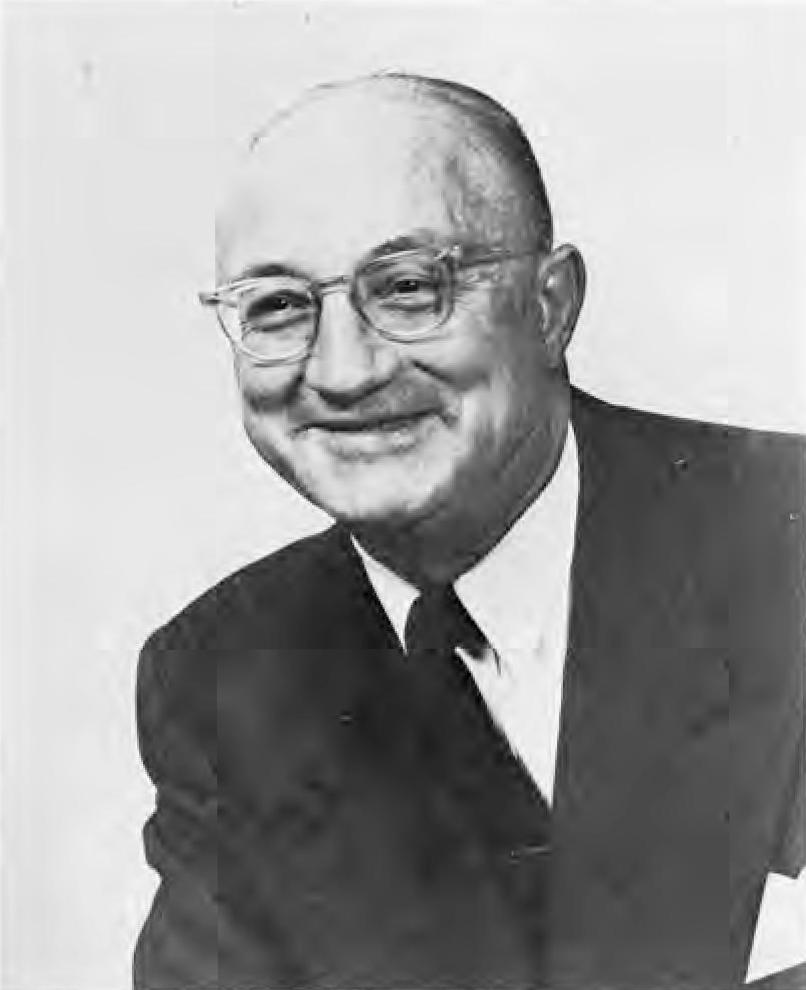
- Anderson, c. 1963

Personal information
- Born: September 11, 1902 Akron, Ohio, U.S.
- Died: June 13, 1967 (aged 64) Fort Lauderdale, Florida, U.S.

Career information
- High school: Central (Akron, Ohio)
- College: Otterbein (1921–1924)
- Coaching career: 1934–1963

Career highlights
- 7× NIT bids (1942, 1944–1946, 1948, 1949, 1954); 3× NCAA tournament bids (1959, 1962, 1963)
- Basketball Hall of Fame
- Collegiate Basketball Hall of Fame

W. Harold Anderson (September 11, 1902 – June 13, 1967) was an American college men's basketball coach at Bowling Green State University and the University of Toledo. As a player, he played at Otterbein College, a small liberal arts college outside Columbus, Ohio. As a coach he was one of the first to win more than 500 games on the collegiate level. Anderson was inducted into the Naismith Basketball Hall of Fame in 1985 and the College Basketball Hall of Fame in 2006.

== Early life ==
Anderson was born September 11, 1902, in Akron, Ohio. He attended Akron Central High School, where he played football, baseball, basketball and ran track.

He then attended Otterbein College in Westerville, Ohio where he earned eleven athletic letters: three each in football, baseball and basketball and two in track.

== Coaching career ==
Anderson began his career as a teacher and coach at Wauseon High School (Ohio) and Toledo Waite High School.

Andreson Coached at the University of Toledo from 1934 to 1942 and compiled a record of 142–41.

Anderson then coached at Bowling Green State University from 1943 to 1963, with a record of 362–185.

His career collegiate coaching record was 504–226.

After his retirement from coaching, Anderson continued to serve Bowling Green State University as the director of athletics.

While pioneering the run and gun, up-tempo style of play, he developed eleven (all of whom played in the NBA) All-America athletes, including Don Otten, Hall of Fame inductee Nate Thurmond and 1950 NBA draft No. 1 overall pick Chuck Share.

== Honors ==
- From 1960 to November 11, 2011, the Bowling Green Falcons played basketball in Anderson Arena, named in honor of their coach. The facility is still in use by other university sports.
- Bowling Green State University Athletics Hall of Fame (1966)
- Toledo Athletics Hall of Fame (1978)
- Anderson was enshrined in the Naismith Basketball Hall of Fame in 1985.
- In 2006, Anderson was inducted into the College Basketball Hall of Fame.
- Anderson is one of the charter inductees of the Ohio Basketball Hall of Fame (2006).

== Head coaching record ==
Record table
Season	Team	Overall	Conference	Standing	Postseason
Toledo Rockets (Independent) (1934–1942)
1934–35	Toledo	13–3			
1935–36	Toledo	12–4			
1936–37	Toledo	18–4			
1937–38	Toledo	14–6			
1938–39	Toledo	17–10			
1939–40	Toledo	24–6			
1940–41	Toledo	21–3			
1941–42	Toledo	23–5			NIT Fourth Place
Toledo:		142–41			
Bowling Green Falcons (Independent) (1942–1953)
1942–43	Bowling Green	18–5			
1943–44	Bowling Green	22–4			NIT Quarterfinal
1944–45	Bowling Green	24–4			NIT Runner-up
1945–46	Bowling Green	27–5			NIT Quarterfinal
1946–47	Bowling Green	28–7			
1947–48	Bowling Green	27–6			NIT Quarterfinal
1948–49	Bowling Green	24–7			NIT Third Place
1949–50	Bowling Green	19–11			
1950–51	Bowling Green	10–4**(15–12)			George Muellich (5–8); Harold Anderson (10–4)
1951–52	Bowling Green	17–10			
1952–53	Bowling Green	12–15			
Bowling Green Falcons (Mid-American Conference) (1953–1963)
1953–54	Bowling Green	17–7	10–3	2nd	NIT Quarterfinal
1954–55	Bowling Green	6–16	5–9	T–5th	
1955–56	Bowling Green	4–19	1–11	7th	
1956–57	Bowling Green	14–9	7–5	T–3rd	
1957–58	Bowling Green	15–8	6–6	4th	
1958–59	Bowling Green	18–8	9–3	T–1st	NCAA University Division First Round
1959–60	Bowling Green	10–14	6–6	3rd	
1960–61	Bowling Green	10–14	4–8	T–5th	
1961–62	Bowling Green	21–4	11–1	1st	NCAA University Division First Round
1962–63	Bowling Green	19–8	9–3	1st	NCAA University Division Regional Fourth Place
Bowling Green:		362–185	68–55		
Total:		504–226			
National champion Postseason invitational champion Conference regular season champion Conference regular season and conference tournament champion Division regular season champion Division regular season and conference tournament champion Conference tournament champion
