= 1942–43 Western Kentucky State Teachers Hilltoppers basketball team =

American college basketball season

1942–43 Western Kentucky State Teachers Hilltoppers basketball

KAIC Champions

NIT Tournament, Quarterfinal
- Conference: Kentucky Intercollegiate Athletic Conference
- Record: 24–3 (6–1 KIAC)
- Head coach: Edgar Diddle (21st season)
- Assistant coach: Ted Hornback
- Home arena: Health & Physical Education Building

The 1942–43 Western Kentucky State Teachers Hilltoppers men's basketball team represented Western Kentucky State Normal School and Teachers College(now known as Western Kentucky University) during the 1942-43 NCAA basketball season. The team was led by future Naismith Memorial Basketball Hall of Fame coach Edgar Diddle and Helms Foundation All-American center Oran McKinney. The Hilltoppers won the Kentucky Intercollegiate Athletic Conference championship and were invited to the 1943 National Invitation Tournament. During this period, the NIT was considered to be the premier college basketball tournament, with the winner being recognized as the national champion. Dero Downing and Wallace “Buck” Sydnor were team captains and Don “Duck” Ray led the team in scoring. There were several military teams on Western Kentucky's schedule, which was not uncommon during World War II.

== Schedule ==
Date time, TV	Opponent	Result	Record	Site city, state
Regular Season
12/4/1942*	Western Carolina	W 64–35	1–0	Health & Phys Ed Building; Bowling Green, KY
12/8/1942*	at Fort Knox	W 54–46	2–0	Fort Knox, KY
12/11/1942*	at Southeast Missouri	W 50–33	3–0	Health & Phys Ed Building; Bowling Green, KY
12/12/1942	at Campbellsville	W 55–15	4–0	Campbellsville, KY
12/12/1942	at Lindsey Wilson	W 74–15	5–0	Columbia, KY
12/18/1942*	at Southern Illinois	W 57–30	6–0	Davies Gym; Carbondale, IL
1/6/1943*	Fort Knox	W 72–24	7–0	Health & Phys Ed Building; Bowling Green, KY
1/9/1943	at Eastern Kentucky	W 61–47	8–0	Weaver Gymnasium; Richmond, KY
1/13/1943*	Fort Knox Company E	W 86–30	9–0	Health & Phys Ed Building; Bowling Green, KY
1/15/1943*	at Tennessee Tech	W 60–24	10–0	Memorial Gymnasium; Cookeville, TN
1/20/1943	Murray State	W 56–33	11–0	Health & Phys Ed Building; Bowling Green, KY
1/23/1943	Eastern Kentucky	W 62–38	12–0	Health & Phys Ed Building; Bowling Green, KY
1/31/1943*	at St. Bonaventure	W 65–32	13–0	Butler Gym; Allegany, NY
2/3/1943*	at CCNY	W 69–49	14–0	New York, NY
2/6/1943*	at La Salle	W 52–44	15–0	Wister Hall; Philadelphia, PA
2/10/1943	Campbellsville	W 86–24	16–0	Health & Phys Ed Building; Bowling Green, KY
2/10/1943*	Berry Field	W 79–23	17–0	Health & Phys Ed Building; Bowling Green, KY
2/13/1943	at DePaul	L 40–44	17–1	University Auditorium; Chicago, IL
2/15/1943*	at Evansville	W 52–48	18–1	Evansville, IN
2/17/1943	at Murray State	L 28–41	18–2	Lovett Auditorium; Murray, KY
2/20/1943*	Goldman Field	W 69–19	20–2	Health & Phys Ed Building; Bowling Green, KY
2/23/1943*	Evansville	W 62–39	21–2	Health & Phys Ed Building; Bowling Green, KY
1943 Kentucky Intercollegiate Athletic Conference Tournament
2/26/1943	vs. Berea; KIAC Tournament Quarterfinal	W 54–37	22–2	Weaver Gymnasium; Richmond, KY
2/27/1943	vs. Murray State; KIAC Tournament Semifinal	W 42–39	23–2	Weaver Gymnasium; Richmond, KY
2/27/1943	vs. Morehead State; KIAC Tournament Final	W 46–35	24–2	Weaver Gymnasium; Richmond, KY
1943 National Invitation Tournament
3/22/1943*	vs. Fordham; NIT Quarterfinal	L 58–60	24–3	Madison Square Garden; New York, NY
*Non-conference game. ^{#}Rankings from AP Poll. (#) Tournament seedings in parentheses.
