= 1935–36 Western Kentucky State Teachers Hilltoppers basketball team =

American college basketball season

1935–36 Western Kentucky State Teachers Hilltoppers basketball

KAIC Champions

National Olympic Playoff
- Conference: Kentucky Intercollegiate Athletic Conference
- Record: 26–4 (10–1 KIAC)
- Head coach: Edgar Diddle (14th season)
- Home arena: Health & Physical Education Building

The 1935–36 Western Kentucky State Teachers Hilltoppers men's basketball team represented Western Kentucky State Normal School and Teachers College (now known as Western Kentucky University) during the 1935-36 NCAA basketball season. The team was led by future Naismith Memorial Basketball Hall of Fame coach Edgar Diddle and leading scorer Brad Mutchler. The Hilltoppers won the Kentucky Intercollegiate Athletic Conference, led NCAA in wins for the 3rd consecutive year, and received an invitation to the National Olympic Playoff representing the South. Mutchler, Max Reed, Elmo Meacham, and William “Red” McCrocklin were selected to the All-SIAA team. Mutchler, Reed, and Meacham were also named to the All-State team.

== Schedule ==
| Date time, TV | Opponent | Result | Record | Site city, state |
Regular Season
| 1/6/1936* | at David Lipscomb | W 50–40 | 1–0 | Nashville, TN |
| 1/7/1936* | at Alabama State Teachers | W 45–41 | 2–0 | Montgomery, AL |
| 1/8/1936* | at South Georgia Teachers | W 44–26 | 3–0 | Statesboro, GA |
| 1/9/1936* | at Tampa | W 40–19 | 4–0 | Tampa, FL |
| 1/10/1936* | at Stetson | W 24–20 | 5–0 | DeLand, FL |
| 1/11/1936* | at Stetson | W 25–24 | 6–0 | DeLand, FL |
| 1/15/1936 | at Murray State | L 15–31 | 6–1 | Lovett Auditorium; Murray, KY |
| 1/17/1936 | Union (KY) | W 44–32 | 7–1 | Health & Phys Ed Building; Bowling Green, KY |
| 1/18/1936 | at Louisville | W 31–25 | 8–1 | Belknap Gymnasium; Louisville, KY |
| 1/25/1936 | Eastern Kentucky | W 46–30 | 9–1 | Health & Phys Ed Building; Bowling Green, KY |
| 1/28/1936* | Middle Tennessee | W 36–14 | 10–1 | Health & Phys Ed Building; Bowling Green, KY |
| 1/30/1936 | at Centre | W 38–31 | 11–1 | Danville, KY |
| 1/31/1936 | at Eastern Kentucky | W 61–23 | 12–1 | Weaver Gymnasium; Richmond, KY |
| 2/1/1936 | at Union (KY) | W 52–35 | 13–1 | Barbourville, KY |
| 2/7/1936 | Louisville | W 34–25 | 14–1 | Health & Phys Ed Building; Bowling Green, KY |
| 2/8/1936* | at Tennessee Tech | W 42–25 | 15–1 | Memorial Gymnasium; Cookeville, TN |
| 2/10/1936 | at Berea | W 40–23 | 16–1 | Berea, KY |
| 2/13/1936* | Louisiana College | W 31–21 | 17–1 | Health & Phys Ed Building; Bowling Green, KY |
| 2/15/1936 | Murray State | W 29–23 | 18–1 | Health & Phys Ed Building; Bowling Green, KY |
| 2/18/1936* | at Middle Tennessee | W 47–27 | 19–1 | Murfreesboro, TN |
| 2/22/1936 | Centre | W 36–28 | 20–1 | Health & Phys Ed Building; Bowling Green, KY |
| 2/24/1936* | Tennessee Tech | W 48–21 | 21–1 | Health & Phys Ed Building; Bowling Green, KY |
1936 Kentucky Intercollegiate Athletic Conference Tournament
| 2/28/1936 | Murray State; KIAC Tournament | W 55–31 | 22–1 | Health & Phys Ed Building; Bowling Green, KY |
| 2/29/1936 | Morehead State; KIAC Tournament Semifinal | W 74–36 | 23–1 | Health & Phys Ed Building; Bowling Green, KY |
| 2/29/1936 | Eastern Kentucky; KIAC Tournament Final | W 34–22 | 24–1 | Health & Phys Ed Building; Bowling Green, KY |
1936 Southern Intercollegiate Athletic Association Tournament
| 3/7/1936 | vs. Stetson; SIAA Tournament | W 50–36 | 25–1 | Jackson, MS |
| 3/9/1936 | vs. Louisiana Tech; SIAA Tournament Semifinal | W 60–41 | 26–1 | Jackson, MS |
| 3/10/1936 | vs. Murray State; SIAA Tournament Final | L 24–26 | 26–2 | Jackson, MS |
National Olympic Playoff
| 3/26/1936* | vs. Arkansas; South vs Southwest | L 36–43 | 26–3 | Little Rock, AR |
| 3/27/1936* | vs. Arkansas; South vs Southwest | L 30–38 | 26–4 | Little Rock, AR |
*Non-conference game. ^{#}Rankings from AP Poll. (#) Tournament seedings in parentheses.
