= 1930 Southern Intercollegiate Athletic Association men's basketball tournament =

- Classification: Division I
- Teams: 14
- Site: Jackson, MS
- Champions: Southwestern Louisiana Bulldogs (1 title)
- Winning coach: E. J. Pickell (1 title)
- Southern Intercollegiate Athletic Association men's basketball tournaments

The 1930 Southern Intercollegiate Athletic Association men's basketball tournament took place February 26–March 1, 1930, at Jackson, MS. The Southwestern Louisiana Bulldogs won their first Southern Intercollegiate Athletic Association title, led by head coach E. J. Pickell.

== Bracket ==
First round February 26
Millsaps
Bye
Birmingham–Southern	47
Louisiana	33
Eastern Kentucky	36
Erskine	34
Centenary	20
Kentucky Wesleyan	22
Louisiana Tech	36
Louisville	26
Mississippi College	35
Georgetown	24
Mercer
Bye
SW Louisiana	37
Chattanooga	33

Quarterfinals; February 27
Millsaps	43
Birmingham-Southern	35
Eastern Kentucky	26
Kentucky Wesleyan	28
Louisiana Tech	34
Mississippi College	33
Mercer	39
SW Louisiana	41

Semifinals; February 28
Millsaps	41
Kentucky Wesleyan	28
Louisiana Tech	21
SW Louisiana	41

Finals; March 1
Millsaps	24
SW Louisiana	26

=== Consolation game ===
March 1

Kentucky Wesleyan 36, Louisiana Tech 37

Jackson, MS

=== Championship ===
March 1

Millsaps 24, Southwestern Lafayette 26

Jackson, MS

== See also ==
- List of SIAA basketball champions
