= 1927 Southern Intercollegiate Athletic Association men's basketball tournament =

- Classification: Division I
- Teams: 13
- Site: Citadel Alumni Gymnasium; Charleston, SC
- Champions: The Citadel Bulldogs (1st title)
- Winning coach: Benny Blatt (1st title)
- Southern Intercollegiate Athletic Association men's basketball tournaments

The 1927 SIAA men's basketball tournament took place March 3–March 5, 1927, at Citadel Alumni Gymnasium in Charleston. The Citadel Bulldogs won their first Southern Intercollegiate Athletic Association title, led by head coach Benny Blatt. It was the first SIAA tournament held in Charleston. Georgetown won two upset victories before elimination by Mercer. The Citadel beat Mercer for the title in overtime. They would not beat Mercer again until 2018. It is still the only postseason tournament won by The Citadel.

== Bracket ==
First round March 3
Western Kentucky	35
Newberry	24
The Citadel
Bye
Charleston
Bye
Chattanooga	47
Presbyterian	31
Furman
Bye
Mississippi College	14
Georgetown	38
Louisiana Tech	50
Wofford	41
Mercer	36
Birmingham-Southern	21

Quarterfinals; March 4
Western Kentucky	36
The Citadel	43
Charleston	35
Chattanooga	58
Furman	28
Georgetown	33
Louisiana Tech	19
Mercer	37

Semifinals; March 5
The Citadel	40
Chattanooga	30
Georgetown	24
Mercer	41

Finals; March 5
The Citadel	42
Mercer	41

=== Championship ===
March 5

The Citadel 42, Mercer 41
Pts: Johnny Douglas 21	Pts: Malcolm Green 17

Citadel Alumni Gymnasium
Charleston, SC

== See also ==
- List of SIAA basketball champions
