= 1934–35 Western Kentucky State Teachers Hilltoppers basketball team =

American college basketball season

1934–35 Western Kentucky State Teachers Hilltoppers basketball

KIAC Champions
- Conference: Kentucky Intercollegiate Athletic Conference
- Record: 24–3 (9–0 KIAC)
- Head coach: Edgar Diddle (13th season)
- Home arena: Health & Physical Education Building

The 1934–35 Western Kentucky State Teachers Hilltoppers men's basketball team represented Western Kentucky State Normal School and Teachers College (now known as Western Kentucky University) during the 1934-35 NCAA basketball season. The team was led by future Naismith Memorial Basketball Hall of Fame coach Edgar Diddle. The Hilltoppers won the Kentucky Intercollegiate Athletic Conference championship and led NCAA in wins for the second consecutive season. Harry Hardin, Brad Mutchler, and future Louisville Cardinals men's basketball coach, Bernard “Peck” Hickman were selected to the All-SIAA and All-KIAC teams.

== Schedule ==
Date time, TV	Opponent	Result	Record	Site city, state
1935 Kentucky Intercollegiate Athletic Conference Tournament
2/21/1935	Berea; KIAC First Round	W 40–19	18–2	Health & Phys Ed Building; Bowling Green, KY
2/22/1935	vs. Georgetown (KY); KIAC Quarterfinal	W 37–10	19–2	Health & Phys Ed Building; Bowling Green, KY
2/23/1935	vs. Morehead State; KIAC Semifinal	W 12–4	20–2	Health & Phys Ed Building; Bowling Green, KY
2/23/1935	vs. Murray State; KIAC Final	W 23–20	21–2	Health & Phys Ed Building; Bowling Green, KY
1935 Southern Intercollegiate Athletic Association Tournament
3/1/1935	vs. Charleston; SIAA First Round	W 48–18	22–2	Jackson, MS
3/2/1935	vs. Mississippi College; SIAA Quarterfinal	W 46–18	23–2	Jackson, MS
3/4/1935	vs. Centenary; SIAA Semifinal	W 23–17	24–2	Jackson, MS
3/5/1935	at Millsaps; SIAA Final	L 29–31	24–3	Jackson, MS
*Non-conference game. ^{#}Rankings from AP Poll. (#) Tournament seedings in parentheses.
