= 1947–48 Western Kentucky State Teachers Hilltoppers basketball team =

American college basketball season

1947–48 Western Kentucky State Teachers Hilltoppers basketball

NCAA Annual Team Champions KAIC champion

NIT Tournament, Semifinals National 3rd Place
- Conference: Kentucky Intercollegiate Athletic Conference
- Record: 28–2 (10–0 KIAC)
- Head coach: Edgar Diddle (26th season)
- Assistant coach: Ted Hornback
- Home arena: Health & Physical Education Building

The 1947–48 Western Kentucky State Teachers Hilltoppers men's basketball team represented Western Kentucky State Teachers College (now known as Western Kentucky University) during the 1947-48 NCAA basketball season. The team was led by future Naismith Memorial Basketball Hall of Fame coach Edgar Diddle. The Hilltoppers won the Kentucky Intercollegiate Athletic Conference championship, were NCAA Annual Team Champions, and received an invitation to the 1948 National Invitation Tournament, where they advanced to the semifinals. During this period, the NIT was considered by many to be the premiere college basketball tournament, with the winner being recognized as the national champion. This was one of the finest teams in Western Kentucky history, they had the best winning percentage in the NCAA, all five starters were named to the All-KIAC Team (Odie Spears, John Oldham, Don “Duck” Ray, Dee Gibson, and Oran McKinney) and three players were listed on various All-American teams, Spears, Ray, and Gibson.

== Schedule ==
Date time, TV	Opponent	Result	Record	Site city, state
Regular Season
12/2/1947	Kentucky Wesleyan	W 51–31	1–0	Health & Phys Ed Building; Bowling Green, KY
12/5/1947*	vs. Canterbury	W 82–34	2–0	Jefferson County Armory; Louisville, KY
12/10/1947*	at Evansville	W 58–42	3–0	Evansville, IN
12/13/1947	Morehead State	W 78–40	4–0	Health & Phys Ed Building; Bowling Green, KY
12/15/1947*	at Fort Knox	W 101–68	5–0	Fort Knox, KY
12/27/1947*	vs. Utah State	W 80–49	6–0	Jefferson County Armory; Louisville, KY
12/29/1947*	at Bowling Green State	L 64–75	6–1	Bowling Green, OH
1/2/1948*	Georgetown (DC)	W 58–37	7–1	Health & Phys Ed Building; Bowling Green, KY
1/5/1948*	Evansville	W 67–44	8–1	Health & Phys Ed Building; Bowling Green, KY
1/10/1948*	Maryville	W 77–37	9–1	Health & Phys Ed Building; Bowling Green, KY
1/14/1948	at Louisville	W 71–44	10–1	Jefferson County Armory; Louisville, KY
1/17/1948*	at Canisius	W 74–52	11–1	Buffalo, NY
1/20/1948*	vs. Long Island	W 62–47	12–1	Madison Square Garden; New York, NY
1/24/1948*	at Saint Joseph's (PA)	W 84–73	13–1	Philadelphia, PA
1/29/1948*	Arkansas State	W 76–37	14–1	Health & Phys Ed Building; Bowling Green, KY
1/31/1948	at Eastern Kentucky	W 49–42	15–1	Weaver Gymnasium; Richmond, KY
2/2/1948	at Kentucky Wesleyan	W 83–52	16–1	Owensboro, KY
2/4/1948*	Bowling Green State	W 66–52	17–1	Health & Phys Ed Building; Bowling Green, KY
2/7/1948	at Murray State	W 59–46	18–1	Lovett Auditorium; Murray, KY
2/10/1948*	North Dakota	W 62–47	19–1	Health & Phys Ed Building; Bowling Green, KY
2/14/1948	Murray State	W 76–65	20–1	Health & Phys Ed Building; Bowling Green, KY
2/17/1948	Louisville	W 77–55	21–1	Health & Phys Ed Building; Bowling Green, KY
2/19/1948	at Morehead State	W 43–40	22–1	Button Auditorium; Morehead, KY
2/21/1948	Eastern Kentucky	W 65–51	23–1	Health & Phys Ed Building; Bowling Green, KY
1948 Kentucky Intercollegiate Athletic Conference Tournament
2/26/1948	vs. Berea; KIAC Tournament Quarterfinal	W 87–51	24–1	Jefferson County Armory; Louisville, KY
2/27/1948	vs. Eastern Kentucky; KIAC Tournament Semifinal	W 62–52	25–1	Jefferson County Armory; Louisville, KY
2/28/1948	at Louisville; KIAC Tournament Final	W 63–62	26–1	Jefferson County Armory; Louisville, KY
1948 National Invitation Tournament
3/12/1948*	vs. La Salle; NIT Quarterfinal	W 68–61	27–1	Madison Square Garden; New York, NY
3/15/1948*	vs. Saint Louis; NIT Semifinal	L 53–60	27–2	Madison Square Garden; New York, NY
3/17/1948*	vs. DePaul; NIT Consolation	W 61–59	28–2	Madison Square Garden; New York, NY
*Non-conference game. ^{#}Rankings from AP Poll. (#) Tournament seedings in parentheses.
