= 1938–39 Western Kentucky State Teachers Hilltoppers basketball team =

American college basketball season

1938–39 Western Kentucky State Teachers Hilltoppers basketball

SIAA Champions KIAC Champions
- Conference: Kentucky Intercollegiate Athletic Conference
- Record: 22–3 (7–0 KIAC)
- Head coach: Edgar Diddle (17th season)
- Assistant coach: Ted Hornback
- Home arena: Health & Physical Education Building

The 1938–39 Western Kentucky State Teachers Hilltoppers men's basketball team represented Western Kentucky State Normal School and Teachers College (now known as Western Kentucky University) during the 1938-39 NCAA basketball season. The team was led by future Naismith Memorial Basketball Hall of Fame coach Edgar Diddle. Former All-State player, Ted Hornback returned to his alma mater this season as assistant coach. He would remain in that position until Diddle's retirement in 1964, when he would be promoted to Athletic Director. The Hilltoppers won the Kentucky Intercollegiate Athletic Conference and Southern Intercollegiate Athletic Association championships. All five starters, John Hackett, Harry Saddler, Wilson Stemm, Herb Ball, and Carlisle Towery, were selected to the All-SIAA team. Hackett, Saddler, and Towery also made the All-KIAC team.

== Schedule ==
Date time, TV	Opponent	Result	Record	Site city, state
1939 Kentucky Intercollegiate Athletic Conference Tournament
2/23/1939	at Eastern Kentucky; KIAC First Round	W 50–26	16–3	Weaver Gymnasium; Richmond, KY
2/24/1939	vs. Louisville; KIAC Quarterfinal	W 47–28	17–3	Weaver Gymnasium; Richmond, KY
2/25/1939	vs. Transylvania; KIAC Semifinal	W 53–40	18–3	Weaver Gymnasium; Richmond, KY
2/25/1939	vs. Morehead State; KIAC Final	W 37–33	19–3	Weaver Gymnasium; Richmond, KY
1939 Southern Intercollegiate Athletic Association Tournament
3/3/1939	Presbyterian; SIAA Quarterfinal	W 51–27	20–3	Health & Phys Ed Building; Bowling Green, KY
3/4/1939	Louisiana Normal; SIAA Semifinal	W 44–33	21–3	Health & Phys Ed Building; Bowling Green, KY
3/4/1939	Jacksonville State; SIAA Final	W 56–43	22–3	Health & Phys Ed Building; Bowling Green, KY
*Non-conference game. ^{#}Rankings from AP Poll. (#) Tournament seedings in parentheses.
