= 1918–19 Centre Colonels men's basketball team =

American college basketball season

1918–19 Centre Colonels men's basketball

SIAA champion
- Conference: Southern Intercollegiate Athletic Association
- Record: 11–0 (8–0 SIAA)
- Head coach: Theodore Gronert
- Captain: Allen Davis

The 1918–19 Centre Colonels men's basketball team represented Centre College during the 1918–19 college basketball season. The team featured Bo McMillin, Red Roberts, Edgar Diddle, and Matty Bell.

== Schedule ==
| Date time, TV | Opponent | Result | Record | Site city, state |
|---|---|---|---|---|
| | Transylvania | W 63–14 | 1–0 | |
| | Transylvania | W 44–12 | 2–0 | |
| | Kentucky State | W 38–30 | 3–0 | |
| | Kentucky State | W 21–10 | 4–0 | |
| | Georgetown | W 47–14 | 5–0 | |
| | Georgetown | W 51–18 | 6–0 | |
| | Vanderbilt | W 28–23 | 7–0 | |
| | Tennessee | W 55–26 | 8–0 | |
| * | Calumet | W 47–17 | 9–0 | |
| * | Louisville | W 55–19 | 10–0 | |
| * | Louisville | W 65–18 | 11–0 | |
*Non-conference game. (#) Tournament seedings in parentheses.
