= 1937–38 Western Kentucky State Teachers Hilltoppers basketball team =

American college basketball season

1937–38 Western Kentucky State Teachers Hilltoppers basketball

SIAA Champions KAIC Champions

NIBT Tournament, Withdrew / Forfeit
- Conference: Kentucky Intercollegiate Athletic Conference
- Record: 30–3 (9–1 KIAC)
- Head coach: Edgar Diddle (16th season)
- Home arena: Health & Physical Education Building

The 1937–38 Western Kentucky State Teachers Hilltoppers men's basketball team represented Western Kentucky State Normal School and Teachers College (now known as Western Kentucky University) during the 1937-38 NCAA basketball season. The team was led by future Naismith Memorial Basketball Hall of Fame coach Edgar Diddle and the school's first player recognized as an All-American, William “Red” McCrocklin. The Hilltoppers won the Kentucky Intercollegiate Athletic Conference and Southern Intercollegiate Athletic Association championships, were the first NCAA team to win 30 games in a season, and received an invitation to the 1938 National Intercollegiate Basketball tournament; however, the team was unable to make the trip and withdrew from the tournament. The NAIA lists the game as a forfeit, but Western Kentucky does not officially recognize the contest. Ralph Dudgeon, Harry Saddlerand, and McCrocklin were selected to the All-SIAA and All-KIAC teams.

== Schedule ==
Date time, TV	Opponent	Result	Record	Site city, state
Regular season
12/9/1937*	at McKendree	W 51–33	1–0	Lebanon, IL
12/10/1937*	at Bradley	L 33–39	1–1	Peoria Armory; Peoria, IL
12/11/1937*	at Illinois College	W 38–36	2–1	Jacksonville, IL
12/15/1937*	McKendree	W 37–28	3–1	Health & Phys Ed Building; Bowling Green, KY
12/16/1937*	at New Albany CCC	W 36–19	4–1	New Albany, IN
12/17/1937*	at Edantide AC	W 34–28	5–1	
12/18/1937*	Ft. Knox Ind	W 38–32	6–1	Health & Phys Ed Building; Bowling Green, KY
12/20/1937*	Beechmont AC	W 60–48	7–1	Health & Phys Ed Building; Bowling Green, KY
1/3/1938*	at Southeast Missouri	W 27–25	8–1	Houck Field House; Cape Girardeau, MO
1/8/1938*	at Vanderbilt	W 39–25	9–1	Old Gymnasium; Nashville, TN
1/13/1938*	at Tennessee Tech	W 40–33	10–1	Memorial Gymnasium; Cookeville, TN
1/15/1938*	Evansville	W 44–30	11–1	Health & Phys Ed Building; Bowling Green, KY
1/19/1938	at Louisville	W 62–42	12–1	Belknap Gymnasium; Louisville, KY
1/22/1938	Murray State	W 29–26	13–1	Health & Phys Ed Building; Bowling Green, KY
1/24/1938*	Vanderbilt	W 38–18	14–1	Health & Phys Ed Building; Bowling Green, KY
1/28/1938	Eastern Kentucky	W 51–34	15–1	Health & Phys Ed Building; Bowling Green, KY
2/1/1938	at Morehead State	W 38–30	16–1	Button Auditorium; Morehead, KY
2/3/1938	Louisville	W 53–32	17–1	Health & Phys Ed Building; Bowling Green, KY
2/5/1938	at Murray State	L 18–30	17–2	Lovett Auditorium; Murray, KY
2/8/1938*	Tennessee Tech	W 31–19	18–2	Health & Phys Ed Building; Bowling Green, KY
2/11/1938*	Bradley	L 24–32	18–3	Health & Phys Ed Building; Bowling Green, KY
2/12/1938	at Eastern Kentucky	W 34–21	19–3	Weaver Gymnasium; Richmond, KY
2/14/1938	at Berea	W 53–23	20–3	Berea, KY
2/16/1938	Morehead State	W 42–25	21–3	Health & Phys Ed Building; Bowling Green, KY
2/17/1938*	at Evansville	W 52–42	22–3	Evansville, IN
2/18/1938	Cumberland (KY)	W 49–36	23–3	Health & Phys Ed Building; Bowling Green, KY
1938 Kentucky Intercollegiate Athletic Conference tournament
2/25/1938	vs. Union (KY); KIAC Tournament	W 28–22	24–3	Weaver Gymnasium; Richmond, KY
2/26/1938	vs. Morehead State; KIAC Tournament Semifinal	W 46–25	25–3	Weaver Gymnasium; Richmond, KY
2/26/1938	vs. Murray State; KIAC Tournament Final	W 35–23	26–3	Weaver Gymnasium; Richmond, KY
1938 Southern Intercollegiate Athletic Association Tournament
3/3/1938	Louisiana Normal; SIAA Tournament	W 45–30	27–3	Health & Phys Ed Building; Bowling Green, KY
3/4/1938	Union (KY); SIAA Tournament Quarterfinal	W 49–28	28–3	Health & Phys Ed Building; Bowling Green, KY
3/5/1938	Delta State; SIAA Tournament Semifinal	W 59–40	29–3	Health & Phys Ed Building; Bowling Green, KY
3/5/1938	Murray State; SIAA Tournament Final	W 44–39	30–3	Health & Phys Ed Building; Bowling Green, KY
1938 National Intercollegiate Basketball tournament
3/8/1938*	vs. Simpson; First Round	L 0–2 ^{Forfeit}	*	Municipal Auditorium; Kansas City, MO
*Non-conference game. ^{#}Rankings from AP Poll. (#) Tournament seedings in parentheses.

- Western Kentucky does not recognize the NIBT game as part of their official records
