= 1936–37 Western Kentucky State Teachers Hilltoppers basketball team =

American college basketball season

1936–37 Western Kentucky State Teachers Hilltoppers basketball

SIAA Champions KIAC Champions
- Conference: Kentucky Intercollegiate Athletic Conference
- Record: 21–2 (5–2 KIAC)
- Head coach: Edgar Diddle (15th season)
- Home arena: Health & Physical Education Building

The 1936–37 Western Kentucky State Teachers Hilltoppers men's basketball team represented Western Kentucky State Normal School and Teachers College (now known as Western Kentucky University) during the 1936-37 NCAA basketball season. The team was led by future Naismith Memorial Basketball Hall of Fame coach Edgar Diddle. Several games scheduled for late January had to be postponed due to flooding along the Ohio River. The Hilltoppers won the Kentucky Intercollegiate Athletic Conference and Southern Intercollegiate Athletic Association championships. Ralph Dudgeon, William “Red” McCrocklin, Max Reed, and Harry Saddler were selected to the All-SIAA team. Dudgeon, McCrocklin, and Saddler, also made the All-KIAC team.

== Schedule ==
Date time, TV	Opponent	Result	Record	Site city, state
1937 Kentucky Intercollegiate Athletic Conference Tournament
2/25/1937	at Eastern Kentucky; KIAC First Round	W 38–25	15–2	Weaver Gymnasium; Richmond, KY
2/26/1937	vs. Kentucky Wesleyan; KIAC Quarterfinal	W 51–26	16–2	Weaver Gymnasium; Richmond, KY
2/27/1937	vs. Transylvania; KIAC Semifinal	W 53–36	17–2	Weaver Gymnasium; Richmond, KY
2/27/1937	vs. Murray State; KIAC Final	W 30–18	18–2	Weaver Gymnasium; Richmond, KY
1937 Southern Intercollegiate Athletic Association Tournament
3/9/1937	Mississippi College; SIAA Quarterfinal	W 60–25	19–2	Health & Phys Ed Building; Bowling Green, KY
3/10/1937	Union (TN); SIAA Semifinal	W 40–33	20–2	Health & Phys Ed Building; Bowling Green, KY
3/10/1937	Murray State; SIAA Final	W 37–32	21–2	Health & Phys Ed Building; Bowling Green, KY
*Non-conference game. ^{#}Rankings from AP Poll. (#) Tournament seedings in parentheses.
