= 1940–41 Western Kentucky State Teachers Hilltoppers basketball team =

American college basketball season

1940–41 Western Kentucky State Teachers Hilltoppers basketball

SIAA Champions
- Conference: Kentucky Intercollegiate Athletic Conference
- Record: 22–4 (5–1 KIAC)
- Head coach: Edgar Diddle (19th season)
- Assistant coach: Ted Hornback
- Home arena: Health & Physical Education Building

The 1940–41 Western Kentucky State Teachers Hilltoppers men's basketball team represented Western Kentucky State Normal School and Teachers College (now known as Western Kentucky University) during the 1940-41 NCAA basketball season. The team was led by future Naismith Memorial Basketball Hall of Fame coach Edgar Diddle and All-American center Carlisle Towery. The Hilltoppers won the Southern Intercollegiate Athletic Association championship. Towery, Howard “Tip” Downing, and Wallace “Buck” Sydnor were selected to the All-SIAA team.

== Schedule ==
Date time, TV	Opponent	Result	Record	Site city, state
1941 Kentucky Intercollegiate Athletic Conference Tournament
2/28/1941	vs. Berea; KIAC Quarterfinal	W 53–33	19–3	Weaver Gymnasium; Richmond, KY
3/1/1941	vs. Murray State; KIAC Semifinal	L 32–41	19–4	Weaver Gymnasium; Richmond, KY
1941 Southern Intercollegiate Athletic Association Tournament
3/6/1941	Delta State; SIAA Quarterfinal	W 49–48	20–4	Health & Phys Ed Building; Bowling Green, KY
3/7/1941	Louisiana Normal; SIAA Semifinal	W 67–46	21–4	Health & Phys Ed Building; Bowling Green, KY
3/8/1941	Murray State; SIAA Final	W 45–41	22–4	Health & Phys Ed Building; Bowling Green, KY
*Non-conference game. ^{#}Rankings from AP Poll. (#) Tournament seedings in parentheses.
