= 1932–33 Western Kentucky State Teachers Hilltoppers basketball team =

American college basketball season

1932–33 Western Kentucky State Teachers Hilltoppers basketball

KIAC Champions
- Conference: Kentucky Intercollegiate Athletic Conference
- Record: 16–6 (6–2 KIAC)
- Head coach: Edgar Diddle (11th season)
- Home arena: Health & Physical Education Building

The 1932–33 Western Kentucky State Teachers Hilltoppers men's basketball team represented Western Kentucky State Normal School and Teachers College (now known as Western Kentucky University) during the 1932-33 NCAA basketball season. The team was led by future Naismith Memorial Basketball Hall of Fame coach Edgar Diddle and team captain Wendell Johnson. The Hilltoppers won the Kentucky Intercollegiate Athletic Conference for the second consecutive year. Harry Hardin, Thomas Hobbs, and future Louisville Cardinals men's basketball coach, Bernard “Peck” Hickman were named to the All-State team.

== Schedule ==
Date time, TV	Opponent	Result	Record	Site city, state
1933 Kentucky Intercollegiate Athletic Conference Tournament
2/22/1933	vs. Georgetown (KY); KIAC First Round	W 31–23	12–5	Winchester, KY
2/23/1933	vs. Transylvania; KIAC Quarterfinal	W 43–23	13–5	Winchester, KY
2/24/1933	vs. Berea; KIAC Semifinal	W 22–15	14–5	Winchester, KY
2/25/1933	at Murray State; KIAC Final	W 30–17	15–5	Winchester, KY
1933 Southern Intercollegiate Athletic Association Tournament
3/1/1933	vs. Erskine; SIAA First Round	W 45–35	16–5	Jackson, MS
3/2/1933	vs. Centenary; SIAA Quarterfinal	L 31–40	16–6	Jackson, MS
*Non-conference game. ^{#}Rankings from AP Poll. (#) Tournament seedings in parentheses.
