= Theodore Gronert =

Biographical details
- Born: June 26, 1886; Prairie Du Chien, Wisconsin
- Died: February 3, 1966
- Education: University of Wisconsin

Theodore Gronert (July 28, 1886 – February 3, 1966) was an American college basketball coach and history professor. He was a veteran of World War I. He coached Bo McMillin and Edgar Diddle at Centre College in basketball. He was chairman of the Wabash College history department, and considered an authority on American and Russian history. He also taught at the University of Arkansas.
