= 1926–27 The Citadel Bulldogs basketball team =

American college basketball season

1926–27 The Citadel Bulldogs men's basketball
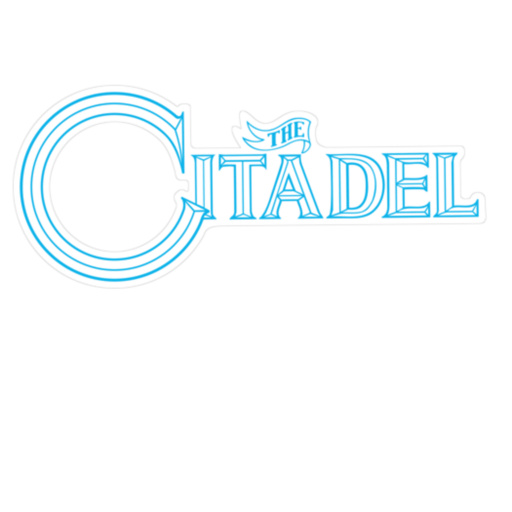

SIAA tournament champions
- Conference: Southern Intercollegiate Athletic Association
- Record: 17–2 (3–0 SIAA)
- Head coach: Benny Blatt

The 1926–27 The Citadel Bulldogs basketball team represented The Citadel, The Military College of South Carolina in the 1926–27 NCAA men's basketball season. The Bulldogs were led by first year head coach Benny Blatt. They played as a member of the Southern Intercollegiate Athletic Association.

The Bulldogs claimed their first Conference tournament title, defeating Mercer in the championship game.

== Schedule ==
Date time, TV	Opponent	Result	Record	Site city, state
January 7*	Parris Island Marines	W 45–19	1–0	Charleston, SC
January 15	Furman	L 25–37	1–1	Charleston, SC
January 22	Newberry	W 35–21	2–1	Charleston, SC
January 28	College of Charleston	W 34–23	3–1	Charleston, SC
January 29	Presbyterian	W 46–23	4–1	Charleston, SC
February 5	Oglethorpe	W 56–26	5–1	Charleston, SC
February 9	at Mercer	W 50–15	6–1	Macon, GA
February 10	at Mercer	W 47–32	7–1	Macon, GA
February 12	Mercer	W 38–33	8–1	Charleston, SC
February 18	Davidson	W 41–26	9–1	Charleston, SC
February 19	Davidson	W 40–36	10–1	Charleston, SC
February 21	Wofford	W 52–37	11–1	Charleston, SC
February 23	at Newberry	W 26–20	12–1	Newberry, SC
February 24	at Presbyterian	W 43–22	13–1	Clinton, SC
February 25	at Wofford	W 41–23	14–1	Spartanburg, SC
February 26	at Furman	L 37–43	14–2	Greenville, SC
SIAA tournament
March 3	Western Kentucky	W 43–36	15–2	Charleston, SC
March 4	Chattanooga	W 40–30	16–2	Charleston, SC
March 5	Mercer	W 42–41	17–2	Charleston, SC
*Non-conference game. (#) Tournament seedings in parentheses.
