= Gradyville, Kentucky =

Unincorporated community in Kentucky, United States

Gradyville
- Unincorporated community
- Location within the state of Kentucky Gradyville (the United States)
- Coordinates: 37°3′48″N 85°25′21″W
- Country: United States
- State: Kentucky
- County: Adair
- Elevation: 699 ft (213 m)
- Time zone: UTC-6 (Central (CST))
  - Summer (DST): UTC-5 (CDT)
- ZIP code: 42742
- Area codes: 270 and 364
- GNIS feature ID: 493073

Gradyville is an unincorporated community in Adair County, Kentucky, United States. Its elevation is 699 feet (213 m). It was the birthplace of Western Kentucky University basketball coach Edgar Diddle.

== History ==
A post office was established in the community in 1848 and was named after its first postmaster, William F. Grady.

In February 1882, an Act of the General Assembly of the Commonwealth of Kentucky was approved that prohibited the sale of alcoholic beverages within one mile of Wilmores and Kemp's storehouse in Gradyville. The Act imposed a $20 fine for each occurrence of violating the act.

Gradyville suffered a flash flood on June 7, 1907, as the result of a cloudburst that precipitated three inches of rain in an hour. The sudden downfall caused Big Creek, a normally small and quiet stream that runs through Gradyville, to rise by ten feet and to wash away several houses that were built on the banks of the creek. The flood resulted in the deaths of 20 Gradyville residents.

Grand Army of the Republic post 153, G.W. Nell, was located in Gradyville.

== Geography ==
Gradyville is located about 7 miles (11 km) west of Columbia along Kentucky Route 80.

== Notable people ==
Edgar Diddle, an American college men's basketball coach, was born near Gradyville in 1895 and was a Gradyville native.

== See also ==
- 5th Kentucky Cavalry Regiment
