= 1933–34 Western Kentucky State Teachers Hilltoppers basketball team =

American college basketball season

1933–34 Western Kentucky State Teachers Hilltoppers basketball

SIAA Champions KIAC Champions
- Conference: Kentucky Intercollegiate Athletic Conference
- Record: 28–8 (4–4 KIAC)
- Head coach: Edgar Diddle (12th season)
- Home arena: Health & Physical Education Building

The 1933–34 Western Kentucky State Teachers Hilltoppers men's basketball team represented Western Kentucky State Normal School and Teachers College (now known as Western Kentucky University) during the 1933-34 NCAA basketball season. The team was led by future Naismith Memorial Basketball Hall of Fame coach Edgar Diddle. The Hilltoppers won the Kentucky Intercollegiate Athletic Conference and Southern Intercollegiate Athletic Association championships, and led NCAA in wins. Harry Hardin, Thomas Hobbs, and future Louisville Cardinals men's basketball coach, Bernard “Peck” Hickman were selected to the All-SIAA team, and Hardin and Hickman were named to the All-State team.

== Schedule ==
Date time, TV	Opponent	Result	Record	Site city, state
1934 Kentucky Intercollegiate Athletic Conference Tournament
2/22/1934	vs. Eastern Kentucky; KIAC First Round	W 30–19	21–8	Belknap Gymnasium; Louisville, KY
2/23/1934	vs. Morehead State; KIAC Quarterfinal	W 32–30	22–8	Belknap Gymnasium; Louisville, KY
2/24/1934	vs. Kentucky Wesleyan; KIAC Semifinal	W 46–17	23–8	Belknap Gymnasium; Louisville, KY
2/25/1934	at Louisville; KIAC Final	W 13–12	24–8	Belknap Gymnasium; Louisville, KY
1934 Southern Intercollegiate Athletic Association Tournament
3/3/1934	vs. Louisville; SIAA First Round	W 31–27	25–8	Jackson, MS
3/4/1934	vs. Louisiana Normal; SIAA Quarterfinal	W 43–41	26–8	Jackson, MS
3/5/1934	vs. Erskine; SIAA Semifinal	W 32–25	27–8	Jackson, MS
3/6/1934	vs. Berea; SIAA Final	W 42–40	28–8	Jackson, MS
*Non-conference game. ^{#}Rankings from AP Poll. (#) Tournament seedings in parentheses.
