= Edgar Diddle =

American college men's basketball coach

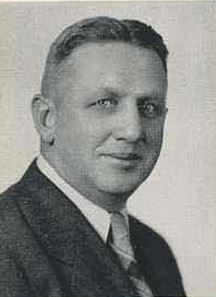
- Diddle during the 1953–54 season

Biographical details
- Born: March 12, 1895; Gradyville, Kentucky, U.S.
- Died: January 2, 1970 (aged 74); Bowling Green, Kentucky, U.S.

Playing career

Football
- 1917: Centre
- 1919–1920: Centre

Basketball
- 1917: Centre
- 1919–1920: Centre
- Position: Halfback (football)

Coaching career (HC unless noted)

Basketball
- 1922–1964: Western Kentucky

Football
- 1922–1928: Western Kentucky

Head coaching record
- Overall: 759–302 (basketball)
- Tournaments: Basketball; 3–4 (NCAA); 7–9 (NIT)
- Basketball Hall of Fame; Inducted in 1972 (profile)
- College Basketball Hall of Fame; Inducted in 2006

Edgar Allen Diddle (March 12, 1895 – January 2, 1970) was an American college men's basketball coach, who also coached college football and baseball teams. He is known for coaching at Western Kentucky University in Bowling Green, Kentucky from 1922 to 1964. Diddle became the first coach in history to coach 1,000 games at one school. Diddle was known as one of the early pioneers of the fast break and for waving a red towel around along the sidelines. During games he would wave, toss, and chew on this towel, and even cover his face in times of disappointment. His red towel is now part of WKU's official athletic logo. Diddle experienced only five losing seasons in 42 years.

== Early life ==
He was born near Gradyville, Kentucky. Diddle played basketball and football for Centre College and was a member of their 1919 undefeated basketball team and 1919 undefeated football team. He was a halfback on the football team. After college, he coached basketball at Monticello High School, where he guided the team to the Kentucky State Tournament semi-finals, and then Greenville High School, which played in a regional tournament at Bowling Green. During the tournament, he came to the attention of officials at Western Kentucky who offered him the coaching position at the college.

== Career at Western Kentucky ==
He became Western Kentucky Hilltoppers basketball coach in 1922. Diddle's Western Kentucky teams claimed 32 conference championships; played in 13 national postseason tournaments (an impressive total considering that there was no national tournament for the first 15 years of his tenure); won 20+ games eighteen different times (including 10 consecutive); became the first team from the South to participate in the Olympic Trials; the first Kentucky team to play in the NCAA tournament and National Invitation Tournament; and were nationally ranked numerous times. In 1942 he led the Hilltoppers to the national championship game. His 1948 team finished 3rd nationally and the 1954 team finished 4th. Diddle's teams led the NCAA in victories six seasons and had the highest winning percentage in 1948. When he retired in 1964, he had won a then record 759 games.

While Diddle was best known for coaching men's basketball, he also coached football (1922–1928), baseball (1923–1957) and women's basketball at Western.

== Legacy ==
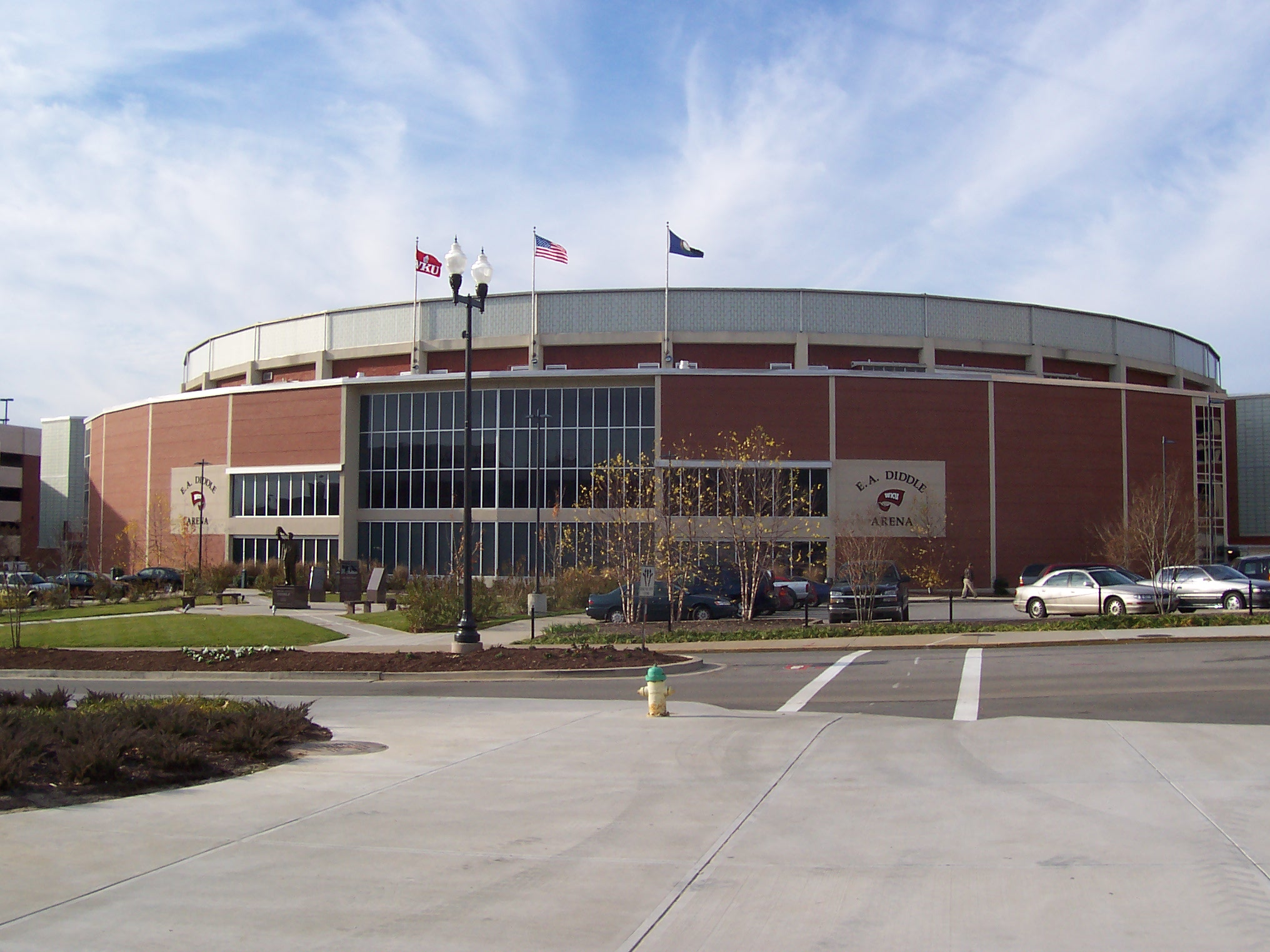
An image of E.A. Diddle Arena.

Diddle was responsible for breaking a color barrier at the college when he recruited the first African American basketball players, Clem Haskins and Dwight Smith, in the early 1960s.

E. A. Diddle Arena, the basketball venue at WKU, built in 1963, is named for him. For the last six years of his life, Diddle was a fixture at the arena, even leading cheers. During a 1968 game against Dayton, he jumped on top of a press table to lead the students in cheers. When a Dayton sportswriter told him to get down, Diddle snapped, "What do you mean I can't get on top of this table? This is my damn gym!".

== Hall of Fame ==
Coach Diddle has been inducted into the Kentucky Sports Hall of Fame, The Naismith Memorial Basketball Hall of Fame, the Western Kentucky University Athletic Hall of Fame, the Centre College Athletic Hall of Fame, and National Collegiate Basketball Hall of Fame.

== Head coaching record ==
=== Men's basketball ===
Record table
Season	Team	Overall	Conference	Standing	Postseason
Western Kentucky State Normal (Independent) (1922–1926)
1922–23	Western Kentucky State Normal	12–2			
1923–24	Western Kentucky State Normal	9–9			
1924–25	Western Kentucky State Normal	8–6			
1925–26	Western Kentucky State Normal	10–4			
Western Kentucky State Normal Hilltoppers (Kentucky Intercollegiate Athletic Conference and Southern Intercollegiate Athletic Association) (1926–1930)
1926–27	Western Kentucky State Normal	12–7			
1927–28	Western Kentucky State Normal	10–7			
1928–29	Western Kentucky State Normal	8–10			
1929–30	Western Kentucky State Normal	4–12			
Western Kentucky State Teachers Hilltoppers (Kentucky Intercollegiate Athletic Conference and Southern Intercollegiate Athletic Association) (1930–1948)
1930–31	Western Kentucky State Teachers	11–3			
1931–32	Western Kentucky State Teachers	15–8		1st KIAC	
1932–33	Western Kentucky State Teachers	16–6		1st KIAC	
1933–34	Western Kentucky State Teachers	28–8		1st KIAC 1st SIAA	
1934–35	Western Kentucky State Teachers	24–3		1st KIAC	
1935–36	Western Kentucky State Teachers	26–4		1st KIAC	National Olympics
1936–37	Western Kentucky State Teachers	21–2		1st KIAC 1st SIAA	
1937–38	Western Kentucky State Teachers	30–3		1st KIAC 1st SIAA	NIBT * (withdrew / forfeit)
1938–39	Western Kentucky State Teachers	22–3		1st KIAC 1st SIAA	
1939–40	Western Kentucky State Teachers	24–6		1st KIAC 1st SIAA	NCAA Elite Eight
1940–41	Western Kentucky State Teachers	22–4		1st SIAA	
1941–42	Western Kentucky State Teachers	29–5		1st KIAC 1st SIAA	NIT Runner-up
1942–43	Western Kentucky State Teachers	24–3		1st KIAC	NIT Quarterfinals
1943–44	Western Kentucky State Teachers	13–9			
1944–45	Western Kentucky State Teachers	17–10			
1945–46	Western Kentucky State Teachers	15–19			
1946–47	Western Kentucky State Teachers	25–4		1st KIAC 1st SIAA	
1947–48	Western Kentucky State Teachers	28–2		1st KIAC; NCAA Annual Team Champions	NIT 3rd Place
Western Kentucky State Hilltoppers (Ohio Valley Conference) (1948–1964)
1948–49	Western Kentucky State	25–4	8–2	1st	NIT Quarterfinals
1949–50	Western Kentucky State	25–6	8–0	1st	NIT Quarterfinals
1950–51	Western Kentucky State	19–10	4–4	4th	NCT 1st Round
1951–52	Western Kentucky State	26–5	11–1	1st	NIT Quarterfinals
1952–53	Western Kentucky State	25–6	8–2	2nd	NIT Quarterfinals
1953–54	Western Kentucky State	29–3	9–1	1st	NIT 4th Place
1954–55	Western Kentucky State	18–10	8–2	1st	
1955–56	Western Kentucky State	16–12	7–3	T-1st	
1956–57	Western Kentucky State	17–9	9–1	T-1st	
1957–58	Western Kentucky State	14–11	5–5	3rd	
1958–59	Western Kentucky State	16–10	8–4	2nd	
1959–60	Western Kentucky State	21–7	10–2	1st	NCAA Sweet Sixteen
1960–61	Western Kentucky State	18–8	9–3	T-1st	
1961–62	Western Kentucky State	17–10	11–1	1st	NCAA Sweet Sixteen
1962–63	Western Kentucky State	5–16	3–9	7th	
1963–64	Western Kentucky State	5–16	3–11	8th	
Western Kentucky:		759–302	121–51		
Total:		759–302			
National champion Postseason invitational champion Conference regular season champion Conference regular season and conference tournament champion Division regular season champion Division regular season and conference tournament champion Conference tournament champion

Lead the NCAA in wins 1933–34, 1934–35, 1935–36, 1937–38, and 1941–42 seasons

=== Baseball ===
Record table
Season	Team	Overall	Conference	Standing	Postseason
Western Kentucky State Normal Hilltoppers (Independent) (1923–1926)
1923	Western Kentucky State Normal	10–2			
1924	Western Kentucky State Normal	11–2			
1925	Western Kentucky State Normal	9–10			
Western Kentucky State Normal Hilltoppers (Southern Intercollegiate Athletic Association) (1926–1948)
1926	Western Kentucky State Normal	9–8			
1927	Western Kentucky State Normal	9–4			
1928	Western Kentucky State Normal	15–1		State Champions	
1929	Western Kentucky State Normal	9–4		State Champions	
Western Kentucky State Teachers Hilltoppers (Southern Intercollegiate Athletic Association) (1930–1948)
1930	Western Kentucky State Teachers	3–0			
1931	Western Kentucky State Teachers	No Team			
1932	Western Kentucky State Teachers	4–2			
1933	Western Kentucky State Teachers	7–5			
1934	Western Kentucky State Teachers	8–3			
1935	Western Kentucky State Teachers	9–2			
1936	Western Kentucky State Teachers	4–3			
1937	Western Kentucky State Teachers	8–7			
1938	Western Kentucky State Teachers	4–10			
1939	Western Kentucky State Teachers	6–10			
1940	Western Kentucky State Teachers	7–6			
1941	Western Kentucky State Teachers	9–6			
1942	Western Kentucky State Teachers	4–5			
1943–45	Western Kentucky State Teachers	No Team			
1946	Western Kentucky State Teachers	9–0			
1947	Western Kentucky State Teachers	5–6			
Western Kentucky State Hilltoppers (Southern Intercollegiate Athletic Association) (1948–1948)
1948	Western Kentucky State	4–10			
Western Kentucky State Hilltoppers (Ohio Valley Conference) (1949–1957)
1949	Western Kentucky State	4–5–1			
1950	Western Kentucky State	6–7			
1951	Western Kentucky State	13–5			
1952	Western Kentucky State	11–3		1st	
1953	Western Kentucky State	8–2–1		1st	
1954	Western Kentucky State	9–7			
1955	Western Kentucky State	4–7			
1956	Western Kentucky State	5–7–1			
1957	Western Kentucky State	10–6			
Total:		232–155–3			
National champion Postseason invitational champion Conference regular season champion Conference regular season and conference tournament champion Division regular season champion Division regular season and conference tournament champion Conference tournament champion

=== Football ===
Year	Team	Overall	Conference	Standing	Bowl/playoffs
Western Kentucky State Normal (Independent) (1922–1926)
1922	Western Kentucky State Normal	9–1			
1923	Western Kentucky State Normal	5–4			
1924	Western Kentucky State Normal	4–5			
1925	Western Kentucky State Normal	3–5–1			
Western Kentucky State Normal Hilltoppers (Southern Intercollegiate Athletic Association) (1926–1928)
1926	Western Kentucky State Normal	4–4–1	1–2–1	19th	
1927	Western Kentucky State Normal	5–4	2–2	T–8th	
1928	Western Kentucky State Normal	8–1	5–1	3rd	
Western Kentucky:		38–24–2	7–3		
Total:		38–24–2			

=== Women's basketball ===
Record table
Season	Team	Overall	Conference	Standing	Postseason
Western Kentucky State Normal (Independent) (1922–1924)
1922–23	Western Kentucky State Normal	5–3			
1923–24	Western Kentucky State Normal	6–3			
Western Kentucky State Normal:		11–6			
Total:		11–6			

== See also ==
- List of college men's basketball coaches with 600 wins
