= 1931–32 Western Kentucky State Teachers Hilltoppers basketball team =

American college basketball season

1931–32 Western Kentucky State Teachers Hilltoppers basketball

KIAC Champions
- Conference: Kentucky Intercollegiate Athletic Conference
- Record: 15–8 (6–5 KIAC)
- Head coach: Edgar Diddle (10th season)
- Home arena: Health & Physical Education Building

The 1931–32 Western Kentucky State Teachers men's basketball team represented Western Kentucky State Normal School and Teachers College (now known as Western Kentucky University) during the 1931-32 NCAA basketball season. The team was led by future Naismith Memorial Basketball Hall of Fame coach Edgar Diddle and team captain Orlie Lawrence. The Hilltoppers won the Kentucky Intercollegiate Athletic Conference, the school's first conference championship. Thomas Hobbs and James O. Lawrence were named to the All-State team.

== Schedule ==
Date time, TV	Opponent	Result	Record	Site city, state
1932 Kentucky Intercollegiate Athletic Conference Tournament
2/25/1932	vs. Transylvania; KIAC Quarterfinal	W 37–25	12–7	Winchester, KY
2/26/1932	vs. Kentucky Wesleyan; KIAC Semifinal	W 29–25	13–7	Winchester, KY
2/27/1932	at Eastern Kentucky; KIAC Final	W 36–27	14–7	Winchester, KY
1932 Southern Intercollegiate Athletic Association Tournament
3/1/1932	vs. Louisiana College; SIAA First Round	W 53–29	15–7	Jackson, MS
3/2/1932	vs. Murray State; SIAA Quarterfinal	L 27–40	15–8	Jackson, MS
*Non-conference game. ^{#}Rankings from AP Poll. (#) Tournament seedings in parentheses.
