= 5th Kentucky Cavalry Regiment =

- Active: December 1861 – May 3, 1865
- Country: United States
- Allegiance: Union
- Branch: Cavalry
- Engagements: Kentucky Campaign; Battle of Chickamauga; Atlanta campaign Battle of Resaca; Siege of Atlanta; Battle of Jonesboro; Battle of Lovejoy's Station; Sherman's March to the Sea; Battle of Griswoldville; Carolinas campaign Battle of Bentonville

The 5th Kentucky Cavalry Regiment was a cavalry regiment that served in the Union Army during the American Civil War.

== Service ==
The 5th Kentucky Cavalry Regiment was organized at Columbia, Kentucky December 1861 to February 1862 and mustered in for a three-year enlistment at Gallatin, Tennessee, on March 31, 1862, under the command of Colonel David Rice Haggard.

The regiment was with the unattached cavalry, Army of the Ohio, to September 1862. 2nd Brigade, Cavalry Division, Army of the Ohio, to November 1862. 4th Division, Center, XIV Corps, Army of the Cumberland, to January 1863. 2nd Brigade, 1st Division, Cavalry Corps, Army of the Cumberland, to July 1863. (District Central Kentucky, Department of the Ohio, April to June 1863; 2nd Brigade, 4th Division, XXIII Corps, to July 1863; 4 companies) 3rd Brigade, 1st Division, Cavalry Corps, Army of the Cumberland, to January 1864. 3rd Brigade, 1st Cavalry Division, XVI Corps, Army of the Tennessee, to April 1864. 3rd Brigade, 3rd Division, Cavalry Corps, Army of the Cumberland, to October 1864. 3rd Brigade, 3rd Division, Cavalry Corps, Military Division Mississippi, to November 1864. 1st Brigade, 3rd Division, Cavalry Corps, Military Division Mississippi, to January 1865. 3rd Brigade, 3rd Division, Cavalry Corps, Military Division Mississippi, to May 1865.

The 5th Kentucky Cavalry mustered out of service on May 3, 1865.

== Detailed service ==
Duty at and near Columbia scouting and operating against guerrillas on border until February 1862. Gradyville, Kentucky, December 12, 1861. Moved to Gallatin, Tennessee, February 1862, and duty there and in Tennessee until September. Lebanon, Tennessee, May 5. Lamb's Ferry May 10. Expedition to Rodgersville, Alabama, 13–14. Lamb's Ferry May 14. Sweeden's Cove June 4. Chattanooga June 7. Raid on Louisville & Nashville Railroad August 12–21 (detachment). Hartsville Road near Gallatin August 21 (detachment). March to Louisville, Kentucky, in pursuit of Braxton Bragg, August 22-September 26. Glasgow, Kentucky, September 18. Pursuit of Bragg into Kentucky October 1–22. Burksville November 8. Kimbrough's Mills, Mill Creek, December 6. Operations against Cluke's forces in central Kentucky February 18-March 5, 1863. Duty at Franklin and in middle Tennessee until June. Near Nashville May 4. University Depot and Cowan July 4. Expedition to Huntsville July 13–22. Expedition to Athens, Alabama, August 2–8, Passage of Cumberland Mountains and Tennessee River and Chickamauga Campaign August 16-September 22. Reconnaissance from Alpine to Summerville and skirmish September 10. Battle of Chickamauga September 19–21. Operations against Wheeler and Roddy September 30-October 17. Smith's Expedition from Nashville to Corinth, Mississippi, December 28, 1863, to January 8, 1864. Smith's Expedition to Okolona, Mississippi, February 11–26. Okolona, Ivey's Hill, February 22. New Albany February 23. Atlanta Campaign May to September. Scout from Alpine to Summerville, May. Near Nickajack Gap May 7. Near Resaca May 13. Battle of Resaca May 14–15. Adairsville May 17. Operations on line of Pumpkin Vine Creek and battles about Dallas, New Hope Church, and Allatoona Hills May 25-June 4. Operations about Marietta and against Kennesaw Mountain June 10-July 2. On line of the Nickajack July 2–5. On line of the Chattahoochie July 5–17. Summerville July 7. Sandtown and Fairburn August 15. Siege of Atlanta July 22-August 25. Kilpatrick's Raid around Atlanta July 18–22. Lovejoy's Station August 20. Flank movement on Jonesboro August 25–30. Flint River Station August 30. Battle of Jonesboro August 31-September 1. Lovejoy's Station September 2–6. Operations against Hood in northern Georgia and northern Alabama September 29-November 3. Camp Creek September 30. Sweetwater and Noyes Creek near Powder Springs October 1–3. Van Wert October 9–10. March to the sea November 15-December 10. Jonesboro November 15. Towallaga Bridge November 16. East Macon November 20. Griswoldsville November 22. Sylvan Grove and near Waynesboro November 27. Waynesboro November 27–28. Near Waynesboro November 28. Near Louisville November 30. Millen Grove and Louisville December 1. Rocky Creek Church December 2. Waynesboro December 4. Siege of Savanhah December 10–21. Campaign of the Carolinas January to April, 1865. Blackville, South Carolina, February 7. Near White Post February 8. Williston February 8. Johnson's Station, February 11. About Columbia February 15–17. Lancaster February 27. Phillips' Cross Roads, North Carolina, March 4. Rockingham March 7. Monroe's Cross Roads March 10. Averysboro, Taylor's Hole Creek, March 16. Battle of Bentonville March 19–21. Occupation of Goldsboro March 24. Advance on Raleigh April 8–13. Morrisville and occupation of Raleigh April 13. Chapel Hill April 15. Bennett's House April 26. Surrender of Johnston and his army.

== Casualties ==
The regiment lost a total of 213 men during service; 4 officers and 32 enlisted men killed or mortally wounded, 5 officers and 172 enlisted men died of disease.

== Commanders ==
- Colonel David Rice Haggard
- Lieutenant Colonel William T. Hoblitzell

== See also ==
- List of Kentucky Civil War Units
- Kentucky in the Civil War
