= Bernard Hickman =

American basketball player and coach

- Hickman pictured in Thoroughbred 1947, Louisville yearbook

Biographical details
- Born: October 5, 1911; Central City, Kentucky, U.S.
- Died: February 20, 2000 (aged 88); Louisville, Kentucky, U.S.

Playing career
- 1931–1935: Western Kentucky
- Position: Guard

Coaching career (HC unless noted)
- 1944–1967: Louisville

Administrative career (AD unless noted)
- 1953–1973: Louisville

Head coaching record
- Overall: 443–183

Accomplishments and honors

Awards
- Helms Athletic Foundation Hall of Fame (1967); National Association of Collegiate Directors of Athletics Hall (1981)

Bernard "Peck" Hickman (October 5, 1911 – February 20, 2000) was an American basketball player and coach. As head coach he led the Louisville Cardinals to the 1948 NAIB Championship (today's NAIA), the 1956 NIT Championship and the school's first NCAA final Four in 1959. He never had a losing season in 23 years as head coach, finishing with a 443–183 overall record, a .708 winning percentage that ranks him among the top 45 NCAA Division I coaches of all time.

== Early life and playing career ==
Hickman was born on October 5, 1911, in Central City, Kentucky.

=== High school ===
He attended Central City High School where he played basketball for head coach George Taylor. Central City went 116–20 during Hickman's four years (1928–31) in high school. They won four region championships and went to four State Tournaments where he made the All-State Tournament team in 1929 and 1931. He was also an all-state basketball player two seasons in 1930–31.

=== College ===
He lettered three seasons at guard at Western Kentucky for head coach Ed Diddle. WKU went 83–25 during Hickman's four years in college. They won four KIAC Tournament Championships and one SIAA Tournament Championship. He made the Kentucky All-State team in 1933 and 1934, the ALL-KIAC Tournament team in 1935, and the ALL-SIAA Tournament team in 1934 and 1935. He graduated from WKU in 1935 with a bachelor's degree in physical education. He completed his master's degree in physical education at the University of Kentucky College of Education in 1944.

== Coaching career ==
=== High school ===
Hickman coached Hodgenville (KY) High School and Valley High School to a combined 216–49 record. He led Valley to the Kentucky Sweet 16 twice.

=== University of Louisville ===
Hickman was hired as head coach and athletic director at Louisville in 1944.

He guided his first team to a 16–4 record. Prior to his arrival the program only had 11 winning seasons in 33 years of play. The Cardinals never had a losing season in Hickman's 23 seasons as head coach.

Hickman led Louisville to their first championship on a national level by winning the NAIB Championship in 1948.

In 1956, his team headed by All American Charlie Tyra won the NIT Championship. In 1956 his team was placed on two years probation, to include bans on postseason play, by the NCAA due to recruiting violations. In 1959, he led the Cardinals to their first NCAA Tournament Final Four.

In 1953, Hickman was named Louisville's athletic director, a position he would hold full-time until his retirement in 1973. One of Hickman's last acts as athletic director was to hire UCLA assistant coach Denny Crum, who would lead the program to two NCAA titles and six final fours en route to the College Basketball hall of fame.

In 24 years as basketball head coach for the Cardinals, Hickman compiled a record of 443–183 (.708). 82 percent of his players graduated, and was the second basketball coach in Kentucky to break the color barrier in 1962 by recruiting Eddie Whitehead, and Wade Houston.

== Awards and honors ==
Hickman was inducted into the Helms Athletic Foundation Hall of Fame in 1967 and to the National Association of Collegiate Directors of Athletics Hall in 1981.

== Head coaching record ==
Record table
Season	Team	Overall	Conference	Standing	Postseason
Louisville Cardinals (KIAC) (1944–1948)
1944–45	Louisville	16–3	—	—	—
1945–46	Louisville	22–6	—	—	KIAC Tournament Participant
1946–47	Louisville	17–6	—	—	KIAC Tournament Participant
1947–48	Louisville	29–6	—	—	NAIB Champion; Olympic Trials Participant
Louisville Cardinals (Ohio Valley Conference) (1948–1949)
1948–49	Louisville	23–10	6—3	3rd	2nd OVC Tournament
Louisville Cardinals (Independent) (1949–1964)
1949–50	Louisville	21–11	—	—	—
1950–51	Louisville	19–7	—	—	NCAA Tournament Sweet 16
1951–52	Louisville	20–6	—	—	NIT Participant
1952–53	Louisville	22–6	—	—	NIT Elite Eight
1953–54	Louisville	22–7	—	—	NIT Participant
1954–55	Louisville	19–8	—	—	NIT Elite Eight
1955–56	Louisville	26–3	—	—	NIT Champion
1956–57	Louisville	21–5	—	—	NCAA Probation
1957–58	Louisville	13–12	—	—	NCAA Probation
1958–59	Louisville	19–12	—	—	NCAA Tournament Final Four
1959–60	Louisville	15–11	—	—	—
1960–61	Louisville	21–8	—	—	NCAA Tournament Sweet 16
1961–62	Louisville	15–10	—	—	—
1962–63	Louisville	14–11	—	—	—
1963–64	Louisville	15–10	—	—	NCAA Tournament Participant
Louisville Cardinals (Missouri Valley Conference) (1964–1967)
1964–65	Louisville	15–10	8–6	4th	—
1965–66	Louisville	16–10	8–6	4th	NIT Participant
1966–67	Louisville	23–5	12–2	1st	NCAA Tournament Sweet 16
Total:		443–183 (.708)			
National champion Postseason invitational champion Conference regular season champion Conference regular season and conference tournament champion Division regular season champion Division regular season and conference tournament champion Conference tournament champion

== See also ==
- List of NCAA Division I Men's Final Four appearances by coach
