= 1948–49 Western Kentucky State Hilltoppers basketball team =

American college basketball season

1948–49 Western Kentucky State Hilltoppers basketball

OVC Tournament Champion Ohio Valley Conference Champion

NIT Tournament, Quarterfinals
- Conference: Ohio Valley Conference

Ranking
- AP: No. 5
- Record: 25–4 (8–2 OVC)
- Head coach: Edgar Diddle (27th season)
- Assistant coach: Ted Hornback
- Home arena: Health & Physical Education Building

The 1948–49 Western Kentucky State Hilltoppers men's basketball team represented Western Kentucky State College (now known as Western Kentucky University) during the 1948-49 NCAA University Division Basketball season. The Hilltoppers were led by future Naismith Memorial Basketball Hall of Fame coach Edgar Diddle and All-American guard John Oldham. This was the inaugural season for the newly established Ohio Valley Conference and Western Kentucky won the conference championships, and appeared in the 1949 National Invitation Tournament. During this period, the NIT was considered by many to be the premiere college basketball tournament, with the winner being recognized as the national champion. Oldham and Center Bob Lavoy were named to the All-Conference team as well as the OVC All-Tournament team. This was the first year that a widely distributed, national poll was published by the Associated Press, and Western Kentucky was ranked 3rd in the initial poll.

== Schedule ==
Date time, TV	Rank^{#}	Opponent^{#}	Result	Record	Site city, state
Regular Season
12/6/1948*		Kentucky Wesleyan	W 62–51	1–0	Health & Phys Ed Building; Bowling Green, KY
12/9/1948*		Emporia State	W 61–34	2–0	Health & Phys Ed Building; Bowling Green, KY
12/11/1948*		Bowling Green State	W 60–51	3–0	Health & Phys Ed Building; Bowling Green, KY
12/13/1948		at Morehead State	W 66–51	4–0 (1-0)	Button Auditorium; Morehead, KY
12/15/1948		at Eastern Kentucky	W 56–53	5–0 (2-0)	Weaver Gymnasium; Richmond, KY
12/18/1948*		vs. Washington and Lee	W 89–43	6–0	Jefferson County Armory; Louisville, KY
12/27/1948*		at Canisius	W 65–55	7–0	Buffalo, NY
12/30/1948*		vs. Long Island	W 83–58	8–0	Madison Square Garden; New York, NY
1/1/1949*		at Saint Joseph's (PA)	W 86–69	9–0	Alumni Memorial Fieldhouse; Philadelphia, PA
1/8/1949*		Berea	W 77–36	10–0	Health & Phys Ed Building; Bowling Green, KY
1/10/1949		Louisville	W 56–44	11–0 (3-0)	Health & Phys Ed Building; Bowling Green, KY
1/13/1949		at Evansville	W 72–66	12–0 (4-0)	Evansville, IN
1/18/1949*	No. 3	at Memphis State	W 78–51	13–0	Memorial Fieldhouse; Memphis, TN
1/21/1949*	No. 3	at Miami	W 78–45	14–0	Miami, FL
1/22/1949*	No. 3	at Miami	W 63–47	15–0	Miami, FL
1/29/1949	No. 4	Eastern Kentucky	L 40–42	15–1 (4-1)	Health & Phys Ed Building; Bowling Green, KY
1/31/1949*	No. 4	Kentucky Wesleyan	W 80–74	16–1	Owensboro Sportscenter; Owensboro, KY
2/2/1949	No. 6	at Louisville	L 64–70	16–2 (4-2)	Jefferson County Armory; Louisville, KY
2/5/1949	No. 6	Murray State	W 61–47	17–2 (5-2)	Health & Phys Ed Building; Bowling Green, KY
2/8/1949	No. 6	Evansville	W 71–47	18–2 (6-2)	Health & Phys Ed Building; Bowling Green, KY
2/11/1949*	No. 6	vs. Baldwin Wallace	W 67–58	19–2	Cleveland Arena; Cleveland, OH
2/12/1949*	No. 6	No. 14 Bowling Green State	L 58–72	19–3	Bowling Green, OH
2/14/1949	No. 6	at Murray State	W 73–54	20–3 (7-2)	Carr Health Building; Murray, KY
2/17/1949	No. 7	Morehead State	W 69–48	21–3 (8-2)	Health & Phys Ed Building; Bowling Green, KY
2/19/1949*	No. 7	East Tennessee	W 90–53	22–3	Health & Phys Ed Building; Bowling Green, KY
1949 Ohio Valley Conference Tournament
2/24/1949	No. 7	vs. Tennessee Tech; OVC Tournament	W 73–42	23–3	Jefferson County Armory; Louisville, KY
2/26/1949	No. 7	vs. Eastern Kentucky; OVC Tournament Semifinal	W 70–54	24–3	Jefferson County Armory; Louisville, KY
2/26/1949	No. 7	at Louisville; OVC Tournament Final	W 74–68	25–3	Jefferson County Armory; Louisville, KY
1949 National Invitation Tournament
3/14/1949*	No. 5	vs. No. 7 Bradley; NIT Quarterfinal	L 86–95	25–4	Madison Square Garden; New York, NY
*Non-conference game. ^{#}Rankings from AP Poll. (#) Tournament seedings in parentheses.
