= 1955–56 Western Kentucky State Hilltoppers basketball team =

American college basketball season

1955–56 Western Kentucky State Hilltoppers basketball

Ohio Valley Conference Co-Champion
- Conference: Ohio Valley Conference
- Record: 16–12 (7–3 OVC)
- Head coach: Edgar Diddle (34th season)
- Assistant coach: Ted Hornback
- Home arena: Health & Physical Education Building

The 1955–56 Western Kentucky State Hilltoppers men's basketball team represented Western Kentucky State College (now known as Western Kentucky University) during the 1955-56 NCAA University Division Basketball season. The Hilltoppers were led by future Naismith Memorial Basketball Hall of Fame coach Edgar Diddle and leading scorer Forest Able. Western finished in a three-way tie for the Ohio Valley Conference championship. There was no conference tournament, so a playoff was held to determine which team would advance to the NCAA tournament, which was won by Morehead State.

== Schedule ==
Date time, TV	Opponent	Result	Record	Site city, state
Ohio Valley Conference Playoff
3/7/1956	vs. Tennessee Tech; OVC Playoff	W 84–80	16–11	Jefferson County Armory; Louisville, KY
3/8/1956	vs. Morehead State; OVC Playoff	L 80–84	16–12	Jefferson County Armory; Louisville, KY
*Non-conference game. ^{#}Rankings from AP Poll. (#) Tournament seedings in parentheses.
