= 1922–23 Chattanooga Mocs basketball team =

American college basketball season

1922–23 Chattanooga Mocs men's basketball

SIAA Champion
- Conference: Southern Intercollegiate Athletic Association
- Record: 10–4 (3–0 SIAA)
- Head coach: Bill Redd (3rd season)

The 1922–23 Chattanooga Mocs basketball team represented University of Tennessee at Chattanooga in the 1922–23 NCAA men's basketball season. They were led by player/coach Bill Redd. The team claimed an SIAA championship and was runner-up of the 1923 Southern Conference men's basketball tournament.
