= 1960–61 Western Kentucky State Hilltoppers basketball team =

American college basketball season

1960–61 Western Kentucky State Hilltoppers basketball

Ohio Valley Conference Co-Champion
- Conference: Ohio Valley Conference
- Record: 18–8 (9–3 OVC)
- Head coach: Edgar Diddle (39th season)
- Assistant coach: Ted Hornback
- Home arena: Health & Physical Education Building

The 1960–61 Western Kentucky State Hilltoppers men's basketball team represented Western Kentucky State College (now known as Western Kentucky University) during the 1960-61 NCAA University Division Basketball season. The Hilltoppers were led by future Naismith Memorial Basketball Hall of Fame coach Edgar Diddle and finished in a three-way tie for the Ohio Valley Conference championship. No conference tournament was held, so a playoff was scheduled to determine which team would go to the NCAA tournament. Western Kentucky lost in the playoff to Morehead State. Bobby Rascoe, Charlie Osborne, and Harry Todd were named to the All-Conference Team.

== Schedule ==
Date time, TV	Opponent	Result	Record	Site city, state
Ohio Valley Conference Playoff
3/8/1961	vs. Morehead State; OVC Playoff	L 72–80 ^{OT}	18–8	Freedom Hall; Louisville, KY
*Non-conference game. ^{#}Rankings from AP Poll. (#) Tournament seedings in parentheses.
