= 1946–47 Western Kentucky State Teachers Hilltoppers basketball team =

American college basketball season

1946–47 Western Kentucky State Teachers Hilltoppers basketball

SIAA Champion KAIC Champion
- Conference: Kentucky Intercollegiate Athletic Conference
- Record: 25–4 (6–2 KIAC)
- Head coach: Edgar Diddle (25th season)
- Assistant coach: Ted Hornback
- Home arena: Health & Physical Education Building

The 1946–47 Western Kentucky State Teachers Hilltoppers men's basketball team represented Western Kentucky State Normal School and Teachers College (now known as Western Kentucky University) during the 1946–47 NCAA basketball season. The team was led by future Naismith Memorial Basketball Hall of Fame coach Edgar Diddle and leading scorer Odie Spears. The Hilltoppers won the Kentucky Intercollegiate Athletic Conference and Southern Intercollegiate Athletic Association championships. Spears, Don "Duck" Ray, and Dee Gibson were named to the All-KIAC team, and Gibson and John Oldham made the All-SIAA team.

== Schedule ==
Date time, TV	Opponent	Result	Record	Site city, state
1947 Kentucky Intercollegiate Athletic Conference Tournament
3/3/1947	vs. Centre; KIAC First Round	W 63–23	19–4	Jefferson County Armory; Louisville, KY
3/4/1947	at Louisville; KIAC Quarterfinal	W 76–52	20–4	Jefferson County Armory; Louisville, KY
3/5/1947	vs. Georgetown (KY); KIAC Semifinal	W 56–38	21–4	Jefferson County Armory; Louisville, KY
3/5/1947	vs. Eastern Kentucky; KIAC Final	W 54–37	22–4	Jefferson County Armory; Louisville, KY
1947 Southern Intercollegiate Athletic Association Tournament
3/6/1947	Northwest Louisiana; SIAA Quarterfinal	W 82–50	23–4	Health & Phys Ed Building; Bowling Green, KY
3/7/1947	Delta State; SIAA Semifinal	W 62–47	24–4	Health & Phys Ed Building; Bowling Green, KY
3/8/1947	Miami (FL); SIAA Final	W 55–46	25–4	Health & Phys Ed Building; Bowling Green, KY
*Non-conference game. ^{#}Rankings from AP Poll. (#) Tournament seedings in parentheses.
