= 1922–23 Western Kentucky State Normal basketball team =

American college basketball season

1922–23 Western Kentucky State Normal basketball
- Conference: Independent
- Record: 12–2
- Head coach: Edgar Diddle (1st season)
- Home arena: The Red Barn

The 1922–23 Western Kentucky State Normal men's basketball team represented Western Kentucky State Normal School and Teachers College during the 1922-23 NCAA basketball season. The team was led by future Naismith Memorial Basketball Hall of Fame coach Edgar Diddle and leading scorer W. B. Owen. This was the first year of Diddle's 42-year tenure at Western Kentucky and it was the best season in the program's short history.

== Schedule ==
1/10/1923 Adairville (IN) W 103–7
1/13/1923 Cumberland (KY) W 32–20
1/17/1923 at Centre L 20–26
1/20/1923 Berea W 23–18
1/22/1923 Union (KY) W 25–22
1/25/1923 at Vanderbilt W 18–10
1/26/1923 at Cumberland (KY) L 16–24
1/27/1923 at Southern Presbyterian W 33–31
2/7/1923 Bethel (TN) W 43–17
2/18/1923 Tennessee Tech W 33–8
2/21/1923 Vanderbilt W 33–13
2/22/1923 at Eastern Kentucky W 29–17
2/22/1923 at Union (TN) W 23–18
3/3/1923 Eastern Kentucky W 33–17
