= 1914–15 Western Kentucky State Normal basketball team =

American college basketball season

1914–15 Western Kentucky State Normal basketball
- Conference: Independent
- Record: 5–1
- Head coach: J. L. Arthur (1st season)

The 1914–15 Western Kentucky State Normal men's basketball team represented Western Kentucky State Normal School (now known as Western Kentucky University) during the school's first season of intercollegiate basketball on record. Though records may be incomplete, the team was coached by J. L. Arthur and won 5 of 6 games played.

== Schedule ==
Bethel (KY) W 38–21
Vanderbilt Training W 40–8
at Middle Tennessee W 33–19
Middle Tennessee L 19–30
Eastern Kentucky W 26–21
at Eastern Kentucky W 22–18
