= 1938 NAIA basketball tournament =

College basketball tournament

1938 NAIA men's basketball tournament
- Teams: 32
- Finals site: Municipal Auditorium, Kansas City, Missouri
- Champions: Central Missouri State (2nd title, 2nd title game, 2nd Final Four)
- Runner-up: Roanoke (1st title game, 1st Final Four)
- Semifinalists: Murray State (1st Fab Four); Washburn (1st Fab Four)

The 1938 NAIA basketball tournament was held in March at Municipal Auditorium in Kansas City, Missouri. The second annual NAIA basketball tournament featured 32 teams playing in a single-elimination format.

This was the first tournament to expand to 32 teams. The tournament featured the only forfeit in tournament history when Western Kentucky State forfeited to Simpson due to the Hilltoppers not showing up. Drake was a last second replacement for Cheyney Normal who could not make it to Kansas City on time. The first-round game between Delta State University (Miss.) and Drury gave the first overtime in tournament history. Delta State beat Drury College 52–51 in one overtime.

The championship game featured Central Missouri State defending their first national championship over Roanoke, making them the first team to win back-to-back titles. It would be the last year without a Chuck Taylor Most Valuable Player Award.

== Awards and honors ==
Many of the records set by the 1938 tournament have been broken, and many of the awards were established much later:

- Leading scorer est. 1963
- Leading rebounder est. 1963
- Chuck Taylor Most Valuable Player est. 1939
- Charles Stevenson Hustle Award est. 1958
- Coach of the Year est. 1954
- Player of the Year est. 1994

== Bracket ==
First round	Second round
Marshall	67
Peru State	60
Marshall	51
Washburn	53
Washburn	37
Winona State	36
TOP TIER
Jordan	32
Ottawa (KS)	31
Jordan	31
Simpson	29
Simpson	2
Western Kentucky	0†
Delta State	52
Drury	51*
Delta State	48
North Texas State	39
North Texas State	31
Morningside	29
TOP TIER
Valparaiso	57
Oregon College	48
Valparaiso	24
Central Missouri State	44
Central Missouri State	36
Dakota Wesleyan	33
Roanoke	45
Nebraska Wesleyan	20
Roanoke	38
West Texas State	34
West Texas State	35
Westminster (MO)	34
BOTTOM TIER
St. Ambrose	50
Kansas Wesleyan	35
St. Ambrose	38
Central State (OK)	36
Central State (OK)	43
Arkansas State Teachers	34
Idaho State	41
Manchester (IN)	38
Idaho State	40
New Mexico A&M State	56
New Mexico A&M State	53
McPherson	37
BOTTOM TIER
NW Missouri State	39
Sioux Falls	27
NW Missouri State	30
Murray State	38
Murray State	47
Drake	40

Elite Eight
Washburn	44
Jordan	21
Delta State	35
Central Missouri State	48
Roanoke	46
St. Ambrose	43
New Mexico A&M State	29
Murray State	30

NAIA national semifinals
Washburn	24
Central Missouri State	44
Roanoke	35
Murray State	29

NAIA national championship
Central Missouri State	45
Roanoke	30
NAIA third-place game
Murray State	33
Washburn	24

- * denotes overtime.
- † denotes forfeit.

== See also ==
- 1938 National Invitation Tournament
