= 1949 National Invitation Tournament =

Annual NCAA basketball competition

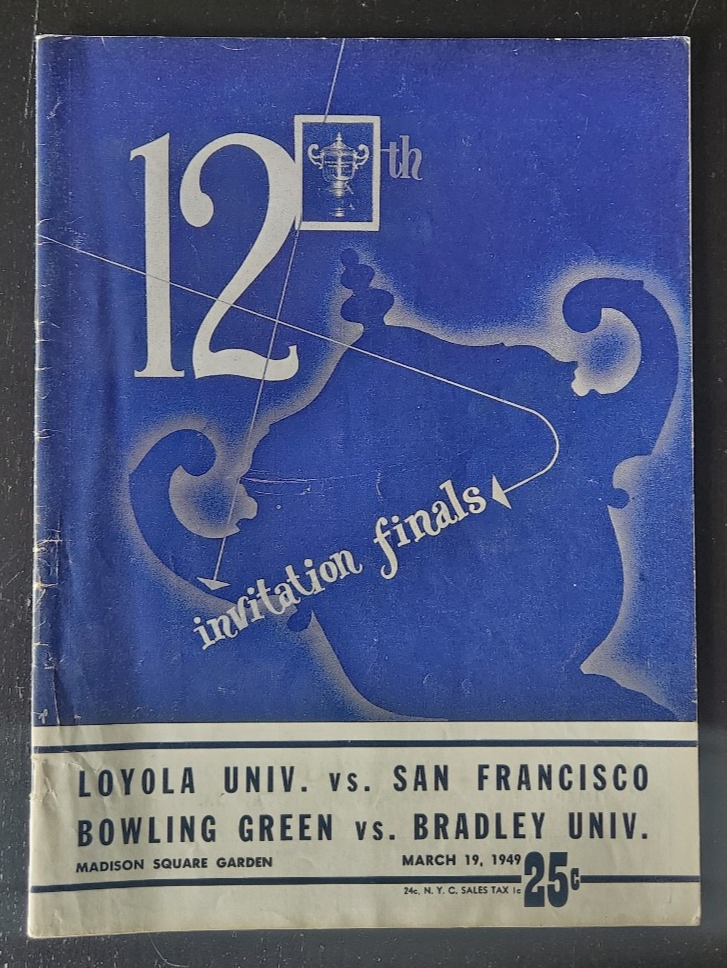

Tournament details
- City: New York City
- Venue: Madison Square Garden
- Teams: 12

Final positions
- Champions: San Francisco Dons (1st title)
- Runners-up: Loyola-Chicago Ramblers
- Semifinalists: Bowling Green Falcons; Bradley Braves

Awards
- MVP: Don Lofgran (San Francisco)

The 1949 National Invitation Tournament was the 1949 edition of the annual NCAA college basketball competition.

== Selected teams ==
Below is a list of the 12 teams selected for the tournament.

- Bowling Green
- Bradley
- CCNY
- Kentucky
- Loyola (IL)
- Manhattan
- NYU
- St. John's
- Saint Louis
- San Francisco
- Utah
- Western Kentucky

== Bracket ==
Below is the tournament bracket.

First round
Loyola (IL) | 62
CCNY | 47
Bradley | 89
NYU | 67
San Francisco | 68
Manhattan | 43
Bowling Green | 77
St. John's | 64

Quarterfinals
Loyola (IL) | 61
Kentucky | 56
Western Kentucky | 86
Bradley | 95
San Francisco | 64
Utah | 63
Saint Louis | 74
Bowling Green | 80

Semifinals
Loyola (IL) | 55
Bradley | 50
San Francisco | 49
Bowling Green | 39

Final
Loyola (IL) | 47
San Francisco | 48

| Third place game |
| Bradley | 77 |
| Bowling Green | 82 |

== See also ==
- 1949 NCAA basketball tournament
- 1949 NAIA Basketball Tournament
