= 1942 National Invitation Tournament =

Annual NCAA basketball competition

Tournament details
- City: New York City
- Venue: Madison Square Garden
- Teams: 8

Final positions
- Champions: West Virginia Mountaineers (1st title)
- Runners-up: Western Kentucky Hilltoppers
- Semifinalists: Creighton Bluejays; Toledo Rockets

Awards
- MVP: Rudy Baric (West Virginia)

The 1942 National Invitation Tournament was the 1942 edition of the annual NCAA college basketball competition.

== Selected teams ==
Below is a list of the 8 teams selected for the tournament.

- CCNY
- Creighton
- Long Island
- Rhode Island
- Toledo
- West Texas State
- West Virginia
- Western Kentucky State

== Bracket ==
Below is the tournament bracket.

Quarterfinals
West Virginia	58
Long Island	49
Toledo	82
Rhode Island	71
Creighton	59
West Texas State	58
Western Kentucky State	49
CCNY	46

Semifinals
West Virginia	51
Toledo	39
Creighton	36
Western Kentucky State	49

Finals
West Virginia	47
Western Kentucky State	45

Third place game
Toledo	46
Creighton	48

== See also ==
- 1942 NCAA basketball tournament
- 1942 NAIA Basketball Tournament
