= 1948 National Invitation Tournament =

Annual NCAA basketball competition

Tournament details
- City: New York City
- Venue: Madison Square Garden
- Teams: 8

Final positions
- Champions: Saint Louis Billikens (1st title)
- Runners-up: NYU Violets
- Semifinalists: Western Kentucky Hilltoppers; DePaul Blue Demons

Awards
- MVP: Ed Macauley (Saint Louis)

The 1948 National Invitation Tournament was the 1948 edition of the annual NCAA college basketball competition.

== Selected teams ==
Below is a list of the eight teams selected for the tournament.

- Bowling Green
- DePaul
- La Salle
- NYU
- NC State
- St. Louis
- Texas
- Western Kentucky State

== Bracket ==
Below is the tournament bracket.

Quarterfinals
Western Kentucky State	68
La Salle	61
St. Louis	69
Bowling Green	53
NYU	45
Texas	43
DePaul	75
NC State	64

Semifinals
Western Kentucky State	53
St. Louis	60
NYU	72
DePaul	59

Final
St. Louis	65
NYU	52
3rd place match
Western Kentucky State	61
DePaul	59

== See also ==
- 1948 NCAA basketball tournament
- 1948 NAIA Basketball Tournament
