= Davies Gym =

Arena in Carbondale, Illinois

- Interactive map of Davies Gym
- Location: Southern Illinois University; Carbondale, IL 62901
- Coordinates: 37.7161°N 89.2159°W
- Owner: Southern Illinois University
- Operator: Southern Illinois University
- Capacity: 1,250

Construction
- Opened: 1925
- Cost: $170,000

Tenants
- Southern Illinois Salukis; Men's basketball (1925–1964); Women's basketball (1925–1988); Volleyball (1925–present)

Davies Gym is the home of the Southern Illinois Salukis women's volleyball team and former home of all indoor sports at SIU. Upon completion of the SIU Arena in 1964, men's programs moved to the new facility. In the 1980s, former Governor of Illinois Jim Thompson allocated $3.35 million to the university to upgrade the facility. While the SIU Arena was being renovated in 2009, Davies Gym was once again used for select activities with the men's and women's programs it used to house.
