= Union Commonwealth Bulldogs =

Athletic teams for Union College in Kentucky

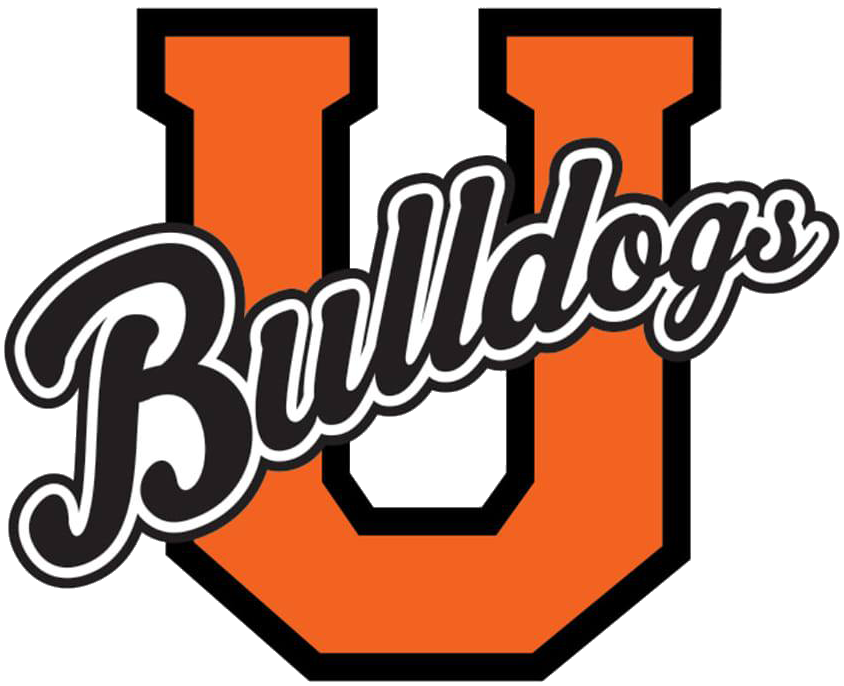
- University: Union Commonwealth University
- Nickname: Bulldogs
- Association: NAIA
- Conference: AAC (primary); Mid-South (archery, bowling)
- Athletic director: Tim Curry
- Location: Barbourville, Kentucky
- Varsity teams: 22 (10 men's, 10 women's, 2 co-ed)
- Football stadium: Williamson Stadium at Burch/Nau Field
- Basketball arena: Robsion Arena
- Baseball stadium: Jerry Carey Stadium at Harlan Sanders Field
- Softball stadium: Union Field
- Soccer stadium: Williamson Stadium at Burch/Nau Field
- Aquatics center: Union College Center for Health & Learning
- Other venues: Wasioto Winds at Pine Mountain State Resort Park
- Colors: Orange and Black
- Mascot: Mack
- Website: www.gounionbulldogs.com
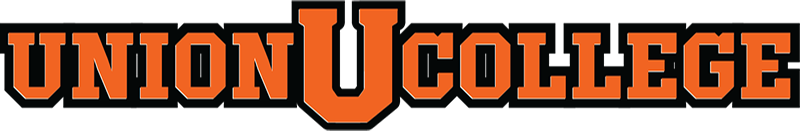

The Union Commonwealth Bulldogs are the athletic teams that represent Union Commonwealth University, located in Barbourville, Kentucky, in intercollegiate sports as a member of the National Association of Intercollegiate Athletics (NAIA), primarily competing in the Appalachian Athletic Conference (AAC) for most of its sports since the 2002–03 academic year; while its men's and women's bowling and archery teams compete in the Mid-South Conference (MSC), which they previously competed in as a full member from 1995–96 to 2001–02. Before March 2024, the school was known as Union College. The school's women's athletic team were known as the Lady Bulldogs until 2014.

== Varsity teams ==
UCU competes in 22 intercollegiate varsity sports:

Men's sports	Women's sports
Baseball	Basketball
Basketball	Bowling
Cross country	Cross country
Football	Golf
Golf	Soccer
Soccer	Softball
Swimming	Swimming
Tennis	Tennis
Track and field	Track and field
	Volleyball
Co-ed sports
Archery

Former sports included men's lacrosse, co-ed cycling and co-ed dance. Intramural sports vary according to student request.

== Notable people ==
- Derek Smith, an American soccer player who currently plays for Cincinnati Kings in the USL Premier Development League
