= Weaver Gymnasium =

Sports venue in Richmond, Kentucky

Weaver Health Building
- Weaver Gym
- Interactive map of Weaver Health Building
- Location: 217 Park Dr; Richmond, Kentucky 40475
- Coordinates: 37.739621°N 84.301594°W
- Owner: Eastern Kentucky University
- Operator: Eastern Kentucky University
- Capacity: 3,700
- Surface: Wood

Construction
- Groundbreaking: 1930
- Built: 1930-31
- Opened: October 3, 1931
- Cost: $204,000 ($4.32 million in 2025 dollars)
- Architect: C.C. Weber

Tenant
- Eastern Kentucky Colonels men's basketball (1931-62)

The Weaver Gymnasium, formally known as the Weaver Health Building, is an on-campus gymnasium on the campus of Eastern Kentucky University in Richmond, Kentucky. It was opened in 1931 and was named for Charles F. Weaver who served for twelve years on EKU's Board of Regents and established two of the first financial awards at EKU. The building, which houses a pool, gymnasium and dance studios, was the third home of the Eastern Kentucky Colonels men's basketball team, replacing a building known as "The Barn." During their time in Weaver, the Maroons (as they were known until 1966) had a record of 225–51 overall and reached the NAIA Men's Basketball Championships twice, in 1945 and 1946, and the 1953 and 1959 NCAA tournament, as well as winning two regular season Ohio Valley Conference titles (1953, 1959 and co-champions in 1961) and two conference tournaments (1950 and 1955). The last Maroons game held in Weaver was a 96–78 loss to the Louisville Cardinals. The building was replaced in 1963 with the Alumni Coliseum, with a revenge win against the same Cardinals. The building now serves as a site for campus fitness and recreation.
