= River States Conference =

US college athletic conference

- Association: NAIA
- Founded: 1916; 110 years ago
- Commissioner: Michael Schell (since March 15, 2018)
- Sports fielded: 18; men's: 9; women's: 9
- No. of teams: 10 (11 in 2027)
- Headquarters: Middletown, Ohio
- Region: Eastern
- Website: riverstatesconference.com

Locations

The River States Conference (RSC), formerly known as the Kentucky Intercollegiate Athletic Conference (KIAC), is a college athletic conference affiliated with the National Association of Intercollegiate Athletics (NAIA). Although it was historically a Kentucky-only conference, it has now expanded to include members in Indiana, Ohio, and West Virginia, and at various times in the past has also had members in Missouri, Pennsylvania, Tennessee, and Virginia.

== History ==
River States Conference
Location of RSC members: current, future

In March 2016, the KIAC announced it would change its name to the River States Conference, effective July 1, 2016, to better reflect its membership, which has expanded beyond Kentucky and now includes members in Pennsylvania, Indiana, Ohio, and West Virginia.

=== Recent changes ===
On July 6, 2022, Carlow University announced that it would leave the RSC and the NAIA to join the NCAA Division III ranks and the Allegheny Mountain Collegiate Conference (AMCC) for the 2023–24 academic year.

On February 28, 2023, Ohio Christian University announced that it would leave the RSC and the NAIA to fully align with the Division I ranks of the National Christian College Athletic Association (NCCAA) for the 2024–25 academic year.

On January 9, 2024, Point Park announced it would leave the RSC and the NAIA to join the NCAA Division II ranks and the Mountain East Conference (MEC) as of the 2024–25 academic year.

On June 27, 2025, Shawnee State University announced that it will leave the RSC and the NAIA to join the NCAA Division II ranks and the MEC, beginning the 2025–26 academic year.

=== Chronological timeline ===
- 1916 – The River States Conference was founded as the Kentucky Intercollegiate Athletic Conference (KIAC). Charter members included Berea College, Centre College, Georgetown College, Kentucky Wesleyan College, the University of Louisville, Ogden College, Transylvania University, and Western Kentucky State Teachers College (now Western Kentucky University) beginning with the 1916–17 academic year.
- 1927
  - Ogden left the KIAC as the school announced that it would merge with Western Kentucky after the 1926–27 academic year.
  - Eastern Kentucky State Teachers College (now Eastern Kentucky University) joined the KIAC in the 1927–28 academic year.
- 1931 – Morehead State Teachers College (now Morehead State University) joined the KIAC in the 1931–32 academic year.
- 1933 – Murray State Teachers College (now Murray State University) and Union College (now Union Commonwealth University) joined the KIAC in the 1933–34 academic year.
- 1948 – Eastern Kentucky, Louisville, Morehead State, Murray State, and Western Kentucky left the KIAC to join the National Collegiate Athletic Association's (NCAA) major-college ranks and to form most of the charter members of the Ohio Valley Conference (OVC) after the 1947–48 academic year.
- 1951 – Bellarmine College (now Bellarmine University) joined the KIAC in the 1951–52 academic year.
- 1955
  - Kentucky Wesleyan left the KIAC after the 1954–55 academic year.
  - Thomas More College (now Thomas More University) joined the KIAC in the 1955–56 academic year.
- 1958 – Pikeville College (now the University of Pikeville) joined the KIAC in the 1958–59 academic year.
- 1962 – Centre (KY) left the KIAC to join the College Athletic Conference after the 1961–62 academic year.
- 1964
  - Bellarmine left the KIAC after the 1963–64 academic year.
  - Campbellsville College (now Campbellsville University) and Rio Grande College (now the University of Rio Grande) joined the KIAC in the 1964–65 academic year.
- 1968 – Oakland City College (now Oakland City University) joined the KIAC in the 1968–69 academic year.
- 1971
  - Rio Grande left the KIAC to join the Mid-Ohio Conference (later known as the American Mideast Conference) after the 1970–71 academic year.
  - Asbury College (now Asbury University) and Clinch Valley College of the University of Virginia (now formally the University of Virginia's College at Wise, and athletically branded as UVA Wise) joined the KIAC in the 1971–72 academic year.
- 1975 – Oakland City left the KIAC after the 1974–75 academic year.
- 1983 – Alice Lloyd College joined the KIAC in the 1983–84 academic year.
- 1984 – Brescia College (now Brescia University) and Lindsey Wilson College (now Lindsey Wilson University) joined the KIAC in the 1984–85 academic year.
- 1991
  - Thomas More left the KIAC to join the NCAA Division III ranks as an independent after the 1990–91 academic year.
  - Midway College (now Midway University) joined the KIAC in the 1991–92 academic year.
- 1992
  - Alice Lloyd left the KIAC to join the Tennessee Valley Athletic Conference (TVAC) after the 1991–92 academic year.
  - Spalding University joined the KIAC in the 1992–93 academic year.
- 1994
  - UVA Wise left the KIAC to become an independent within the NAIA (which would later join the Tennessee-Virginia Athletic Conference (TVAC) beginning the 1995–96 academic year) after the 1993–94 academic year.
  - Indiana University Southeast (athletically IU Southeast or IUS) joined the KIAC in the 1994–95 academic year.
- 1995 – Campbellsville, Georgetown (KY), and Union (KY) left the KIAC to form part as charter members of the Mid-South Conference after the 1994–95 academic year.
- 1999 – Bethel College of Tennessee (now Bethel University of Tennessee) joined the KIAC in the 1999–2000 academic year.
- 2000
  - Lindsey Wilson and Pikeville left the KIAC to join the Mid-South after the 1999–2000 academic year.
  - Mid-Continent University joined the KIAC in the 2000–01 academic year.
- 2001 – Transylvania left the KIAC to join the NCAA Division III ranks and the Heartland Collegiate Athletic Conference (HCAC) after the 2000–01 academic year.
- 2003 – The St. Louis College of Pharmacy (SLCP) joined the KIAC in the 2003–04 academic year.
- 2005 – Alice Lloyd re-joined the KIAC in the 2005–06 academic year.
- 2006 – Bethel (TN) and Mid-Continent left the KIAC after the 2005–06 academic year.
- 2007
  - Spalding left the KIAC to join the NCAA Division III ranks and the St. Louis Intercollegiate Athletic Conference (SLIAC) after the 2006–07 academic year.
  - Indiana University East (athletically IU East) and Mountain State University joined the KIAC in the 2007–08 academic year.
- 2008 – Cincinnati Christian University joined the KIAC in the 2008–09 academic year.
- 2012
  - Mountain State left the KIAC as the school announced that it would close after the 2011–12 academic year.
  - Carlow University and Point Park University joined the KIAC in the 2012–13 academic year.
- 2013 – Indiana University Kokomo (athletically IU Kokomo) joined the KIAC in the 2013–14 academic year.
- 2014
  - Two institutions left the KIAC to join their respective new home primary conferences: Berea left the NAIA to join the NCAA Division III ranks as an independent (which would later join the USA South Athletic Conference (USA South) beginning the 2017–18 academic year), and UHSP St. Louis to join the American Midwest Conference, both effective after the 2013–14 academic year.
  - Rio Grande rejoined the KIAC in the 2014–15 academic year.
- 2015 – Ohio Christian University and West Virginia University Institute of Technology (WVU Tech or West Virginia Tech) joined the KIAC in the 2015–16 academic year.
- 2016 – The KIAC was rebranded as the River States Conference (RSC) in the 2016–17 academic year.
- 2019 – Cincinnati Christian left the RSC as the school announced that it would close at the end of the fall 2019 semester during the 2019–20 academic year.
- 2020 – Oakland City rejoined the RSC in the 2020–21 academic year.
- 2021:
  - Asbury left the RSC and the NAIA to join the NCAA Division III ranks as an independent as well as the Division I ranks of the National Christian Collegiate Athletic Association (NCCAA) after the 2020–21 academic year.
  - Ohio Valley University and Saint Mary-of-the-Woods College joined the RSC in the 2021–22 academic year.
  - Ohio Valley left the RSC as the school announced that it would close at the end of the fall 2021 semester, during the 2021–22 academic year.
- 2023:
  - Carlow left the RSC and the NAIA to join the NCAA Division III ranks and the Allegheny Mountain Collegiate Conference (AMCC) after the 2022–23 academic year.
  - Indiana University–Purdue University Columbus (IUPUC, now Indiana University Columbus) and Shawnee State University joined the RSC in of the 2023–24 academic year.
- 2024 – Two institutions left the RSC and the NAIA to join their respective new home primary conferences, both effective after the 2023–24 academic year:
  - Ohio Christian to fully align with the Division I ranks of the NCCAA
  - Point Park to join the NCAA Division II ranks and the Mountain East Conference (MEC)
  - Campbellsville University, Cumberland University and Georgetown College joined the RSC as affiliate members for men's volleyball in the 2025 spring season (2024–25 academic year).
- 2025:
  - Alice Lloyd left the RSC to become an NAIA Independent and compete within the Continental Athletic Conference after the 2024–25 academic year.
  - Kentucky Christian University joined the RSC in the 2025–26 academic year.
- 2026:
  - Oakland City left the RSC, as the school announced the suspension of its undergraduate programs for the 2026–27 academic year.
  - Shawnee State left the RSC and the NAIA to join the NCAA Division II ranks and the Mountain East (MEC) after the 2025–26 academic year.
- 2027 – Salem University will join the RSC in the 2027–28 academic year.

== Member schools ==
=== Current members ===
The River States currently has 10 full members, with five being public schools, four being private schools, and one member that operates public and private institutions within a single entity.

Institution	Location	Founded	Affiliation	Enrollment	Nickname	Joined (Note: Represents the calendar year when fall sports competition begins.)
Brescia University	Owensboro, Kentucky	1925	Catholic (Ursulines)	638	Bearcats	1984 (Note: The Brescia men's and women's basketball teams joined the RSC 25 years after becoming a full member for other sports (2009–10).)
Indiana University Columbus (Note: IU Columbus joined the River States (RSC) as IUPUC, an extension of Indiana University–Purdue University Indianapolis (IUPUI). When IUPUI was split in 2024 into separate institutions affiliated with the Indiana University and Purdue University systems, almost all of IUPUC's academic programs and its athletic program transferred to the new IU Columbus.) (IU Columbus)	Columbus, Indiana	1970 (Note: IU Columbus did not exist as a standalone institution until 2024, but traces its history through its academic and athletic predecessor of Indiana University–Purdue University Columbus (IUPUC).)	Public (Note: Part of the Indiana University System.)	1,411	Crimson Pride	2023 (Note: The IU Columbus (formerly IUPUC) men's and women's basketball teams joined the RSC a year after becoming a full member for other sports (2024–25).)
Indiana University East (IU East)	Richmond, Indiana	1971	Public	2,985	Red Wolves	2007 (Note: The IU East women's basketball team joined the KIAC/RSC seven years after becoming a full member for other sports (2014–15).)
Indiana University Kokomo (IU Kokomo)	Kokomo, Indiana	1945	Public	2,892	Cougars	2013 (Note: The IU Kokomo women's basketball team joined the KIAC/RSC a year after becoming a full member for other sports (2014–15).)
Indiana University Southeast (IU Southeast)	New Albany, Indiana	1941	Public	3,752	Grenadiers	1994
Kentucky Christian University	Grayson, Kentucky	1919	Christian	541	Knights	2025
Midway University (Note: This institution was a women's college, but has since then been a co-educational institution, therefore it does compete in some men's sports (Midway since 2016–17).)	Midway, Kentucky	1847	Disciples of Christ	1,945	Eagles	1991
University of Rio Grande	Rio Grande, Ohio	1876	Hybrid (Note: Rio Grande consists of a public community college and a private, nonsectarian four-year university. The community college is part of the University System of Ohio.)	2,168	RedStorm	1964; 2014 (Note: Rio Grande left the KIAC after the 1970–71 school year, before rejoining in the 2014–15 school year.)
Saint Mary-of-the-Woods College	Saint Mary-of-the-Woods, Indiana	1840	Catholic (Sisters of Providence)	1,227	Pomeroys	2021
West Virginia University Institute of Technology (WVU Tech)	Beckley, West Virginia	1895	Public (Note: Part of the West Virginia University System.)	1,448	Golden Bears	2015

=== Future members ===
The River States will have one future member, a private school:

Institution	Location	Founded	Affiliation	Enrollment	Nickname	Joining (Note: Represents the calendar year when fall sports competition begins.)	Current primary conference
Salem University	Salem, West Virginia	1888	Private (For-profit)	894	Tigers	2027	NCAA D-II Independent

=== Affiliate members ===
The River States has three affiliate members, all are private schools:

Institution	Location	Founded	Affiliation	Enrollment	Nickname	Joined (Note: Represents the calendar year when fall sports competition begins.)	RSC sport(s)	Current conference
Campbellsville University	Campbellsville, Kentucky	1906	Baptist	12,451	Tigers	2024	men's volleyball	Mid-South (MSC)
Cumberland University	Lebanon, Tennessee	1842	Nonsectarian	3,072	Phoenix	2024	men's volleyball	Mid-South (MSC)
Georgetown College	Georgetown, Kentucky	1829	Baptist	1,463	Tigers	2024	men's volleyball	Mid-South (MSC)

=== Former members ===
The River States has thirty-two former full members, all but seven were private schools. School names and nicknames reflect those used in the final school year each institution was a conference member:

Institution	Location	Founded	Affiliation	Enrollment	Nickname	Joined (Note: Represents the calendar year when fall sports competition begins.)	Left (Note: Represents the calendar year when spring sports competition ends.)	Current conference
Alice Lloyd College	Pippa Passes, Kentucky	1923	Nondenominational	553	Eagles	1983; 2005 (Note: Alice Lloyd left the KIAC after the 1991–92 school year, before rejoining in the 2005–06 school year.)	1992; 2025	Continental
Asbury University	Wilmore, Kentucky	1890	Christian	1,942	Eagles	1971	2021	C.C. South (CCS) (Note: Current NCAA Division III athletic conference.)
Bellarmine College (Note: Currently known as Bellarmine University since 2000.)	Louisville, Kentucky	1950	Catholic (Archdiocese of Louisville)	2,993	Knights	1951	1964	Atlantic Sun (ASUN) (Note: Current NCAA Division I athletic conference.)
Berea College	Berea, Kentucky	1855	Christian (unaffiliated)	1,487	Mountaineers	1916	2014	Heartland (HCAC)
Bethel College (Note: Currently known as Bethel University since 2009.)	McKenzie, Tennessee	1842	Cumberland; Presbyterian	2,974	Wildcats	1999	2006	Mid-South (MSC)
Campbellsville College (Note: Currently known as Campbellsville University since 1996.)	Campbellsville, Kentucky	1906	Baptist	12,451	Tigers	1964	1995	Mid-South (MSC)
Carlow University	Pittsburgh, Pennsylvania	1929	Catholic (R.S.M.)	2,310	Celtics	2012	2023	Allegheny Mountain (AMCC)
Centre College	Danville, Kentucky	1819	Presbyterian (PCUSA)	1,356	Colonels	1916	1962	Southern (SAA)
Clinch Valley College (Note: Known since 1999 as the University of Virginia's College at Wise. Academically marketed and athletically branded as UVA Wise.)	Wise, Virginia	1954	Public	1,911	Highland; Cavaliers (Note: UVA Wise dropped "Highland" from its nickname in 2017.)	1971	1994	South Atlantic (SAC) (Note: Current NCAA Division II athletic conference.)
Cincinnati Christian University	Cincinnati, Ohio	1924	Christian	N/A	Eagles	2008	2019 (Note: Cincinnati Christian closed at the end of the 2019 fall semester, without completing the rest of the 2019–20 school year.)	Closed in 2019
Cumberland College (Note: Currently known as the University of the Cumberlands since 2005.)	Williamsburg, Kentucky	1887	Nondenominational	20,327	Indians (Note: Cumberlands (KY) changed its nickname to Patriots in 2002.)	1966	1995	Mid-South (MSC)
Eastern Kentucky State Teachers College (Note: Later renamed as Eastern Kentucky State College immediately after leaving the KIAC, and known since 1966 as Eastern Kentucky University.)	Richmond, Kentucky	1906	Public	15,008	Colonels	1927	1948	United
Georgetown College	Georgetown, Kentucky	1829	Baptist	1,463	Tigers	1916	1995	Mid-South (MSC)
Kentucky Wesleyan College	Winchester, Kentucky (Note: Kentucky Wesleyan moved to its current campus in Owensboro, Kentucky, in 1956.)	1858	United Methodist	834	Panthers	1916	1955	Great Midwest (G-MAC)
Lindsey Wilson College (Note: Currently known since 2025 as Lindsey Wilson University.)	Columbia, Kentucky	1903	United Methodist	4,055	Blue Raiders	1984	2000	Mid-South (MSC)
University of Louisville	Louisville, Kentucky	1798	Public	22,139	Cardinals	1916	1948	Atlantic Coast (ACC)
Mid-Continent University	Mayfield, Kentucky	1949	Baptist	N/A	Cougars	2000	2006	Closed in 2014
Morehead State Teachers College (Note: Later renamed as Morehead State College immediately after leaving the KIAC, and currently known as Morehead State University since 1966.)	Morehead, Kentucky	1922	Public	8,618	Eagles	1931	1948	Ohio Valley (OVC)
Mountain State University (Note: Mountain State was a non-basketball member school on the women's side during its tenure in the KIAC/RSC.)	Beckley, West Virginia	1933	Nonsectarian	N/A	Cougars	2007 (Note: The Mountain State men's basketball team joined the KIAC/RSC two years after becoming a full member for other sports (2009–10).)	2012	Closed in 2012
Murray State Teachers College (Note: Later renamed as Murray State College immediately after leaving the KIAC, and currently known as Murray State University since 1966.)	Murray, Kentucky	1922	Public	9,841	Racers	1933	1948	Missouri Valley (MVC)
Oakland City University	Oakland City, Indiana	1885	Baptist	650	Mighty Oaks	1968; 2020 (Note: Oakland City had been a member until after the 1974–75 school year, during the conference's KIAC era, before rejoining in the 2020–21 school year.)	1975; 2026	Closed in 2026
Ogden College	Bowling Green, Kentucky	1906	Nonsectarian	N/A	Eagles	1916	1927	N/A (Note: Ogden was merged into Western Kentucky University in 1927.)
Ohio Christian University	Circleville, Ohio	1948	C.C.C.U.	1,483	Trailblazers	2015	2024	NCCAA Independent
Ohio Valley University	Vienna, West Virginia	1960	Churches of Christ	N/A	Fighting Scots	2021	2021 (Note: Ohio Valley closed at the end of the 2021 fall semester, without completing the rest of the 2021–22 school year.)	Closed in 2021
Pikeville College (Note: Currently known as the University of Pikeville since 2011.)	Pikeville, Kentucky	1889	Presbyterian (PCUSA)	2,610	Bears	1958	2000	Appalachian (AAC)
Point Park University	Pittsburgh, Pennsylvania	1960	Nonsectarian	3,299	Pioneers	2012	2024	Mountain East (MEC)
St. Louis College of Pharmacy (Note: Currently known as the University of Health Sciences and Pharmacy in St. Louis, and athletically branded as UHSP since 2020.)	St. Louis, Missouri	1864	Nonsectarian	631	Eutectics	2003	2014	American Midwest (closing in 2027) (Note: After the 2026–27 school year, UHSP will merge into Washington University in St. Louis and become WashU's pharmacy college. The UHSP athletic program will also merge into WashU.)
Shawnee State University	Portsmouth, Ohio	1986	Public	3,206	Bears	2023	2026	Mountain East (MEC)
Spalding University	Louisville, Kentucky	1814	Catholic (S.C.N.)	1,555	Golden Eagles	1992	2007	St. Louis (SLIAC)
Thomas More College (Note: Known since 2020 as Thomas More University.)	Crestview Hills, Kentucky	1921	Catholic (Diocese of Covington/ Benedictines)	1,947	Saints	1955	1991	Great Midwest (G-MAC)
Transylvania University	Lexington, Kentucky	1780	Disciples of Christ	1,022	Pioneers	1916	2001	Heartland (HCAC)
Union College (Note: Known since 2024 as Union Commonwealth University.)	Barbourville, Kentucky	1879	United Methodist	1,129	Bulldogs	1933	1995	Appalachian (AAC)
Western Kentucky State Teachers College (Note: Later renamed as Western Kentucky State College immediately after leaving the KIAC, and currently known as Western Kentucky University since 1966.)	Bowling Green, Kentucky	1906	Public	16,759	Hilltoppers & Lady Toppers	1916	1948	Conf. USA (CUSA)

=== Membership timeline ===
Full member (non-football) Associate member (sport) Other conference

== Conference sports ==
The River States Conference currently sponsors 18 sports (9 men's and 9 women's).

A divisional format is used for men's & women's basketball, and women's volleyball.
East
- IU East
- Kentucky Christian
- Midway
- Rio Grande
- West Virginia Tech
West
- Brescia
- IU Columbus
- IU Kokomo
- IU Southeast
- Saint Mary-of-the-Woods

Conference sports
Sport	Men's	Women's
Baseball	✓	
Basketball	✓	✓
Cross Country	✓	✓
Golf	✓	✓
Soccer	✓	✓
Softball		✓
Tennis	✓	✓
Track & Field Indoor	✓	✓
Track & Field Outdoor	✓	✓
Volleyball	✓	✓
