= Western Kentucky Hilltoppers basketball statistical leaders =

This is a list of individual statistical leaders of the Western Kentucky Hilltoppers basketball program in various categories, including points, assists, blocks, rebounds, and steals. Within those areas, the lists identify single-game, single-season, and career leaders. The Hilltoppers represent Western Kentucky University in the NCAA's Conference USA.

Western Kentucky began competing in intercollegiate basketball in 1914. However, the school's record book does not generally list records from before the 1950s, as records from before this period are often incomplete and inconsistent. Since scoring was much lower in this era, and teams played much fewer games during a typical season, it is likely that few or no players from this era would appear on these lists anyway.

The NCAA did not officially record assists as a statistic until the 1983–84 season, and blocks and steals until the 1985–86 season, but Western Kentucky's record books includes players in these stats before these seasons. These lists are updated through the end of the 2020–21 season.

== Scoring ==
Career
| Rk | Player | Points | Seasons |
|---|---|---|---|
| 1 | Jim McDaniels | 2,238 | 1968–69 1969–70 1970–71 |
| | Courtney Lee | 2,238 | 2004–05 2005–06 2006–07 2007–08 |
| 3 | Ralph Crosthwaite | 2,076 | 1954–55 1956–57 1957–58 1958–59 |
| 4 | Tom Marshall | 1,909 | 1950–51 1951–52 1952–53 1953–54 |
| 5 | Taveion Hollingsworth | 1,896 | 2017–18 2018–19 2019–20 2020–21 |
| 6 | Brett McNeal | 1,856 | 1985–86 1986–87 1987–88 1988–89 |
| 7 | T. J. Price | 1,782 | 2011–12 2012–13 2013–14 2014–15 |
| 8 | Johnny Britt | 1,765 | 1972–73 1973–74 1974–75 1975–76 |
| 9 | Kannard Johnson | 1,738 | 1983–84 1984–85 1985–86 1986–87 |
| 10 | Anthony Winchester | 1,732 | 2002–03 2003–04 2004–05 2005–06 |

Season
| Rk | Player | Points | Season |
|---|---|---|---|
| 1 | Jim McDaniels | 878 | 1970–71 |
| 2 | Tom Marshall | 829 | 1953–54 |
| 3 | Courtney Lee | 735 | 2007–08 |
| 4 | Jim McDaniels | 716 | 1969–70 |
| 5 | Bobby Rascoe | 694 | 1961–62 |
| 6 | Tellis Frank | 684 | 1986–87 |
| 7 | Bob Lavoy | 671 | 1949–50 |
| 8 | Jim McDaniels | 644 | 1968–69 |
| 9 | Clem Haskins | 633 | 1964–65 |
| 10 | Brett McNeal | 621 | 1988–89 |

Single game
| Rk | Player | Points | Season | Opponent |
|---|---|---|---|---|
| 1 | Clem Haskins | 55 | 1964–65 | Middle Tennessee |
| 2 | Art Spoelstra | 52 | 1953–54 | Morehead State |
| 3 | Darel Carrier | 50 | 1963–64 | Morehead State |

== Rebounds ==
Career
| Rk | Player | Rebounds | Seasons |
|---|---|---|---|
| 1 | Tom Marshall | 1,565 | 1950–51 1951–52 1952–53 1953–54 |
| 2 | Art Spoelstra | 1,367 | 1950–51 1951–52 1952–53 1953–54 |
| 3 | Ralph Crosthwaite | 1,309 | 1954–55 1956–57 1957–58 1958–59 |
| 4 | Jim McDaniels | 1,118 | 1968–69 1969–70 1970–71 |
| 5 | Justin Johnson | 1,057 | 2014–15 2015–16 2016–17 2017–18 |
| 6 | Bob Daniels | 964 | 1953–54 1954–55 1955–56 1956–57 |
| 7 | Greg Smith | 932 | 1965–66 1966–67 1967–68 |
| 8 | Harry Todd | 924 | 1959–60 1960–61 1961–62 |
| 9 | George Fant | 894 | 2011–12 2012–13 2013–14 2014–15 |
| 10 | Dan King | 888 | 1950–51 1951–52 1952–53 1953–54 |

Season
| Rk | Player | Rebounds | Season |
|---|---|---|---|
| 1 | Tom Marshall | 477 | 1953–54 |
| 2 | Jim McDaniels | 454 | 1970–71 |
| 3 | Bob Daniels | 418 | 1955–56 |
| 4 | Art Spoelstra | 412 | 1953–54 |
| 5 | Tom Marshall | 397 | 1952–53 |
| 6 | Ralph Crosthwaite | 383 | 1957–58 |
| 7 | Chris Marcus | 374 | 2000–01 |
| 8 | Greg Smith | 362 | 1967–68 |
| 9 | Justin Johnson | 359 | 2017–18 |
| 10 | Tom Marshall | 351 | 1951–52 |

Single game
| Rk | Player | Rebounds | Season | Opponent |
|---|---|---|---|---|
| 1 | Tom Marshall | 29 | 1953–54 | Louisville |
| 2 | Granville Bunton | 27 | 1971–72 | Morehead State |
| 3 | Tom Marshall | 25 | 1953–54 | Regis |
| | Charlie Osborne | 25 | 1960–61 | East Tennessee |
| | Harry Todd | 25 | 1961–62 | Middle Tennessee |
| | Ralph Townsend | 25 | 1963–64 | East Tennessee |
| | Jim McDaniels | 25 | 1970–71 | East Tennessee |

== Assists ==
Career
| Rk | Player | Assists | Seasons |
|---|---|---|---|
| 1 | James McNary | 440 | 1984–85 1985–86 1986–87 |
| 2 | Derek Robinson | 413 | 1998–99 1999–00 2000–01 2001–02 |
| 3 | Dayvion McKnight | 412 | 2020–21 2021–22 2022–23 |
| 4 | Bobby Jones | 375 | 1980–81 1981–82 1982–83 1983–84 |
| 5 | Jamal Crook | 358 | 2009–10 2010–11 2011–12 2012–13 |
| 6 | Orlando Mendez-Valdez | 355 | 2005–06 2006–07 2007–08 2008–09 |
| 7 | Brett McNeal | 354 | 1985–86 1986–87 1987–88 1988–89 |
| 8 | Darrin Horn | 352 | 1991–92 1992–93 1993–94 1994–95 |
| 9 | Gene Rhodes | 349 | 1948–49 1949–50 1950–51 1951–52 |
| 10 | A.J. Slaughter | 332 | 2006–07 2007–08 2008–09 2009–10 |

Season
| Rk | Player | Assists | Season |
|---|---|---|---|
| 1 | James McNary | 202 | 1986–87 |
| 2 | Patrick Sparks | 195 | 2002–03 |
| 3 | Gene Rhodes | 182 | 1951–52 |
| 4 | Darius Thompson | 181 | 2017–18 |
| 5 | Dayvion McKnight | 176 | 2021–22 |
| 6 | James McNary | 175 | 1985–86 |
| 7 | Gene Rhodes | 167 | 1950–51 |
| 8 | Anthony Palm | 159 | 1989–90 |
| 9 | Anthony Palm | 149 | 1990–91 |
| 10 | A.J. Slaughter | 147 | 2009–10 |

Single game
| Rk | Player | Assists | Season | Opponent |
|---|---|---|---|---|
| 1 | Ed Gampfer | 14 | 1973–74 | Middle Tennessee |

== Steals ==
Career
| Rk | Player | Steals | Seasons |
|---|---|---|---|
| 1 | Darnell Mee | 259 | 1990–91 1991–92 1992–93 |
| 2 | Courtney Lee | 242 | 2004–05 2005–06 2006–07 2007–08 |
| 3 | Josh Anderson | 237 | 2017–18 2018–19 2019–20 2020–21 2021–22 |
| 4 | Chris Robinson | 203 | 1992–93 1993–94 1994–95 1995–96 |
| 5 | A.J. Slaughter | 169 | 2006–07 2007–08 2008–09 2009–10 |
| 6 | Taveion Hollingsworth | 155 | 2017–18 2018–19 2019–20 2020–21 |
| 7 | Brett McNeal | 148 | 1985–86 1986–87 1987–88 1988–89 |
| 8 | Dayvion McKnight | 147 | 2020–21 2021–22 2022–23 |
| 9 | Darius Hall | 146 | 1991–92 1992–93 1993–94 1994–95 |
| 10 | Darrin Horn | 139 | 1991–92 1992–93 1993–94 1994–95 |

Season
| Rk | Player | Steals | Season |
|---|---|---|---|
| 1 | Darnell Mee | 100 | 1992–93 |
| 2 | Darnell Mee | 94 | 1991–92 |
| 3 | Courtney Lee | 77 | 2005–06 |
| 4 | Mark Bell | 76 | 1992–93 |
| 5 | Patrick Sparks | 73 | 2002–03 |
| 6 | Josh Anderson | 69 | 2021–22 |
| 7 | Chris Robinson | 68 | 1995–96 |
| 8 | Darnell Mee | 65 | 1990–91 |
| | Courtney Lee | 65 | 2007–08 |
| | Lamonte Bearden | 65 | 2017–18 |

Single game
| Rk | Player | Steals | Season | Opponent |
|---|---|---|---|---|
| 1 | Darnell Mee | 9 | 1992–93 | Jacksonville |
| | Darnell Mee | 9 | 1992–93 | Louisiana Tech |

== Blocks ==
Career
| Rk | Player | Blocks | Seasons |
|---|---|---|---|
| 1 | Jamarion Sharp | 279 | 2021–22 2022–23 |
| 2 | Jeremy Evans | 224 | 2006–07 2007–08 2008–09 2009–10 |
| 3 | Chris Marcus | 214 | 1999–00 2000–01 2001–02 2002–03 |
| 4 | Clarence Martin | 198 | 1982–83 1983–84 1984–85 1985–86 1986–87 |
| 5 | Ben Lawson | 185 | 2013–14 2014–15 2015–16 2016–17 |
| 6 | Charles Bassey | 184 | 2018–19 2019–20 2020–21 |
| 7 | Elgrace Wilborn | 161 | 2004–05 2005–06 |
| 8 | Darius Hall | 125 | 1991–92 1992–93 1993–94 1994–95 |
| 9 | George Fant | 124 | 2011–12 2012–13 2013–14 2014–15 |
| 10 | Darnell Mee | 110 | 1990–91 1991–92 1992–93 |

Season
| Rk | Player | Blocks | Season |
|---|---|---|---|
| 1 | Jamarion Sharp | 148 | 2021–22 |
| 2 | Jamarion Sharp | 131 | 2022–23 |
| 3 | Chris Marcus | 97 | 2000–01 |
| 4 | Charles Bassey | 87 | 2020–21 |
| 5 | Elgrace Wilborn | 83 | 2004–05 |
| 6 | Charles Bassey | 81 | 2018–19 |
| 7 | Elgrace Wilborn | 78 | 2005–06 |
| 8 | Chris Marcus | 76 | 1999–00 |
| 9 | Clarence Martin | 69 | 1986–87 |
| 10 | Jeremy Evans | 68 | 2008–09 |

Single game
| Rk | Player | Blocks | Season | Opponent |
|---|---|---|---|---|
| 1 | Jamarion Sharp | 10 | 2021–22 | Alabama A&M |
| 2 | Chris Marcus | 9 | 2000–01 | Tennessee State |
| | Elgrace Wilborn | 9 | 2005–06 | FIU |
