= List of 1957–58 NBA season transactions =

This is a list of all personnel changes for the 1957 NBA off-season and 1957-58 NBA season.

== Events ==
=== August 15, 1957 ===
- The Syracuse Nationals sold George King to the Cincinnati Royals.

=== September 12, 1957 ===
- The Minneapolis Lakers traded Walter Dukes to the Detroit Pistons for Larry Foust.

=== October 10, 1957 ===
- The Philadelphia Warriors sold Larry Costello to the Syracuse Nationals.

=== November 7, 1957 ===
- The Cincinnati Royals signed Monk Meineke as a free agent.

=== December 10, 1957 ===
- The Cincinnati Royals sold Tom Marshall to the Detroit Pistons.
- The New York Knicks sold Phil Jordon to the Detroit Pistons.

=== December 18, 1957 ===
- Charles Eckman resigns as head coach for Fort Wayne Pistons.

=== December 19, 1957 ===
- The Detroit Pistons hired Red Rocha as head coach.

=== December 28, 1957 ===
- The Syracuse Nationals sold Joe Holup to the Detroit Pistons.

=== January 14, 1958 ===
- The Minneapolis Lakers fired George Mikan as head coach.
- The Minneapolis Lakers hired John Kundla as head coach.

=== January 19, 1958 ===
- The Philadelphia Warriors traded Walt Davis to the St. Louis Hawks for Dave Plunkett.

=== February 5, 1958 ===
- The Minneapolis Lakers traded Art Spoelstra to the New York Knicks for Bo Erias and cash.

=== February 16, 1958 ===
- The St. Louis Hawks traded Frank Selvy to the Minneapolis Lakers for Dick Boushka and Terry Rand.

=== February 18, 1958 ===
- The Detroit Pistons waived Tom Marshall.

=== February 20, 1958 ===
- The Cincinnati Royals claimed Tom Marshall on waivers from the Detroit Pistons.

=== April 5, 1958 ===
- Vince Boryla resigns as head coach for New York Knicks.

=== April 8, 1958 ===
- The New York Knicks hired Andrew Levane as head coach.

=== April 10, 1958 ===
- John Kundla resigns as head coach for Minneapolis Lakers.

=== April 30, 1958 ===
- Alex Hannum resigns as head coach for St. Louis Hawks.

=== May 24, 1958 ===
- The St. Louis Hawks hired Andy Phillip as head coach.

=== June 10, 1958 ===
- The Syracuse Nationals traded Dick Farley and Earl Lloyd to the Detroit Pistons for cash.

== Notes ==
- ^{a} Number of years played in the NBA prior to the draft
- ^{b} Career with the franchise that drafted the player
- ^{c} Never played a game for the franchise
