= 1951–52 Western Kentucky State Hilltoppers basketball team =

American college basketball season

1951–52 Western Kentucky State Hilltoppers basketball

OVC Tournament Champion Ohio Valley Conference Champion

NIT Tournament, Quarterfinals
- Conference: Ohio Valley Conference

Ranking
- Coaches: No. 16
- Record: 26–5 (11–1 OVC)
- Head coach: Edgar Diddle (30th season)
- Assistant coach: Ted Hornback
- Home arena: Health & Physical Education Building

The 1951–52 Western Kentucky State Hilltoppers men's basketball team represented Western Kentucky State College (now known as Western Kentucky University) during the 1951-52 NCAA University Division Basketball season. The Hilltoppers were led by future Naismith Memorial Basketball Hall of Fame coach Edgar Diddle and leading scorer, forward Tom Marshall. The Hilltoppers won the Ohio Valley Conference season and tournament championships, and were invited to the 1952 National Invitation Tournament. During this period, the NIT was considered on par with the NCAA tournament. Marshall, Art Spoelstra, Gene Rhodes, and Richard White were named to the All-Conference and OVC Tournament teams.

== Schedule ==
Date time, TV	Rank^{#}	Opponent^{#}	Result	Record	Site city, state
Regular Season
11/30/1951*		Southeastern Louisiana	W 77–57	1–0	Health & Phys Ed Building; Bowling Green, KY
12/1/1951		Tennessee Tech	W 89–62	2–0 (1-0)	Health & Phys Ed Building; Bowling Green, KY
12/6/1951		at Evansville	W 69–56	3–0 (2-0)	Evansville, IN
12/8/1951*		Bowling Green State	W 89–57	4–0	Health & Phys Ed Building; Bowling Green, KY
12/10/1951		at Morehead State	W 65–54	5–0 (3-0)	Button Auditorium; Morehead, KY
12/15/1951*		at Cincinnati	W 76–71	6–0	Cincinnati Gardens; Cincinnati, OH
12/17/1951*		Central Missouri	W 76–56	7–0	Health & Phys Ed Building; Bowling Green, KY
12/19/1951*	No. 16	vs. Xavier	W 92–82	8–0	Jefferson County Armory; Louisville, KY
12/29/1951*	No. 11	vs. St. Bonaventure	L 60–73	8–1	Memorial Auditorium; Buffalo, NY
1/1/1952*	No. 11	at No. 13 La Salle	L 58–67	8–2	Wister Hall; Philadelphia, PA
1/3/1952*		vs. No. 11 Seton Hall	L 65–77	8–3	Madison Square Garden; New York, NY
1/12/1952		at Murray State	W 77–64	9–3 (4-0)	Carr Health Building; Murray, KY
1/16/1952		at Tennessee Tech	W 64–55	10–3 (5-0)	Memorial Gymnasium; Cookeville, TN
1/19/1952		Eastern Kentucky	W 69–63	11–3 (6-0)	Health & Phys Ed Building; Bowling Green, KY
1/25/1952*		at Miami	W 102–74	12–3	Miami, FL
1/28/1952*		at Tampa	W 82–77	13–3	Tampa, FL
1/30/1952*		Cincinnati	W 79–63	14–3	Health & Phys Ed Building; Bowling Green, KY
2/2/1952		Marshall	W 76–65	15–3 (7-0)	Health & Phys Ed Building; Bowling Green, KY
2/5/1952	No. 20	at Morehead State	W 80–72	16–3 (8-0)	Button Auditorium; Morehead, KY
2/7/1952*	No. 20	Tampa	W 79–70	17–3	Health & Phys Ed Building; Bowling Green, KY
2/9/1952	No. 20	at Eastern Kentucky	L 62–73	17–4 (8-1)	Weaver Gymnasium; Richmond, KY
2/12/1952		at Marshall	W 86–82	18–4 (9-1)	Veterans Memorial Fieldhouse; Huntington, WV
2/16/1952		Murray State	W 97–63	19–4 (10-1)	Health & Phys Ed Building; Bowling Green, KY
2/18/1952		Evansville	W 92–58	20–4 (11-1)	Health & Phys Ed Building; Bowling Green, KY
1952 Ohio Valley Conference Tournament
2/21/1952		vs. Evansville; OVC Tournament	W 83–63	21–4	Jefferson County Armory; Louisville, KY
2/22/1952		vs. Marshall; OVC Tournament Semifinal	W 89–74	22–4	Jefferson County Armory; Louisville, KY
2/23/1952		vs. Murray State; OVC Tournament Final	W 47–45	23–4	Jefferson County Armory; Louisville, KY
Regular Season
2/27/1952*	No. 18	at Kentucky Wesleyan	W 94–68	24–4	Owensboro Sportscenter; Owensboro, KY
3/3/1952*	No. 18	at Bowling Green State	W 82–75	25–4	Bowling Green, OH
1952 National Invitation Tournament
3/8/1952*	No. 18	vs. No. 17 Louisville; NIT First Round	W 62–59	26–4	Madison Square Garden; New York, NY
3/10/1952*	No. 18	vs. No. 15 St. Bonaventure; NIT Quarterfinal	L 69–70	26–5	Madison Square Garden; New York, NY
*Non-conference game. ^{#}Rankings from AP Poll. (#) Tournament seedings in parentheses.
