= 1975–76 Western Kentucky Hilltoppers basketball team =

American college basketball season

1975–76 Western Kentucky Hilltoppers basketball

OVC Tournament Champion Ohio Valley Conference Champion

NCAA Tournament, First Round
- Conference: Ohio Valley Conference
- Record: 20–9 (11–3 OVC)
- Head coach: Jim Richards
- Home arena: E. A. Diddle Arena

1975–76 Ohio Valley Conference men's basketball standings
	Conf.				Overall
Team	W		L	PCT	W		L	PCT
Western Kentucky †	11	–	3	.786	20	–	9	.690
Austin Peay State	10	–	4	.714	20	–	7	.741
Morehead State	7	–	7	.500	13	–	14	.481
Tennessee Tech	7	–	7	.500	14	–	10	.583
Middle Tennessee	6	–	8	.429	16	–	12	.571
Eastern Kentucky	6	–	8	.429	10	–	15	.400
Murray State	5	–	9	.357	9	–	17	.346
East Tennessee State	4	–	10	.286	6	–	20	.231
† 1976 OVC tournament winner Rankings from AP Poll

The 1975–76 Western Kentucky Hilltoppers men's basketball team represented Western Kentucky University during the 1975–76 NCAA Division I men's basketball season. The Hilltoppers were led by Ohio Valley Conference Coach of the Year Jim Richards and OVC Player of the Year Johnny Britt. WKU won the OVC regular season and tournament championships, as well as the conference's automatic bid to the 1976 NCAA Division I Basketball Tournament. Wilson James joined Britt on the All-OVC Team; they were also selected to the OVC Tournament team and Britt was tournament MVP.

== Schedule ==
Date time, TV	Rank^{#}	Opponent^{#}	Result	Record	Site city, state
Regular season
11/29/1975*		Arkansas–Little Rock	W 106–78	1–0	E. A. Diddle Arena; Bowling Green, KY
12/1/1975*		No. 19 Memphis State	W 87–84	2–0	E. A. Diddle Arena; Bowling Green, KY
12/8/1975*		ODU	W 84–76	3–0	E. A. Diddle Arena; Bowling Green, KY
12/20/1975*		Troy	W 88–72	4–0	E. A. Diddle Arena; Bowling Green, KY
12/26/1975*		at No. 9 NC State; Holiday Doubleheader	L 98–110	4–1	Reynolds Coliseum; Raleigh, NC
12/27/1975*		vs. Duke; Holiday Doubleheader	L 90–111	4–2	Reynolds Coliseum; Raleigh, NC
12/30/1975*		at Butler	W 76–62	5–2	Hinkle Fieldhouse; Indianapolis, IN
1/5/1976*		No. 20 La Salle	L 100–104 ^{OT}	5–3	E. A. Diddle Arena; Bowling Green, KY
1/8/1976*		at Florida State	L 80–88	5–4	Tully Gymnasium; Tallahassee, FL
1/10/1976*		MacMurray	W 106–52	6–4	E. A. Diddle Arena; Bowling Green, KY
1/12/1976		at Middle Tennessee	W 83–69	7–4 (1-0)	Murphy Center; Murfreesboro, TN
1/17/1976		East Tennessee	W 82–60	8–4 (2-0)	E. A. Diddle Arena; Bowling Green, KY
1/19/1976		Tennessee Tech	W 88–69	9–4 (3-0)	E. A. Diddle Arena; Bowling Green, KY
1/24/1976		Eastern Kentucky	W 78–74	10–4 (4-0)	E. A. Diddle Arena; Bowling Green, KY
1/26/1976		at Morehead State	L 71–82	10–5 (4-1)	Wetherby Gymnasium; Morehead, KY
1/31/1976		Murray State	W 92–68	11–5 (5-1)	E. A. Diddle Arena; Bowling Green, KY
2/2/1976		at Austin Peay	L 81–91	11–6 (5-2)	Dunn Center; Clarksville, TN
2/7/1976		Middle Tennessee	L 65–71	11–7 (5-3)	E. A. Diddle Arena; Bowling Green, KY
2/9/1976*		Dayton	L 82–93	11–8	E. A. Diddle Arena; Bowling Green, KY
2/14/1976		at Tennessee Tech	W 105–97	12–8 (6-3)	Memorial Gymnasium; Cookeville, TN
2/16/1976		at East Tennessee	W 76–67	13–8 (7-3)	Memorial Center; Johnson City, TN
2/19/1976		at Murray State	W 70–68	14–8 (8-3)	Racer Arena; Murray, KY
2/21/1976		Morehead State	W 100–82	15–8 (9-3)	E. A. Diddle Arena; Bowling Green, KY
2/23/1976		Eastern Kentucky	W 89–77	16–8 (10-3)	E. A. Diddle Arena; Bowling Green, KY
2/28/1976		Austin Peay	W 76–75	17–8 (11-3)	E. A. Diddle Arena; Bowling Green, KY
1976 Ohio Valley Conference Men's Basketball Tournament
3/1/1976	(1)	(8) East Tennessee; First Round	W 91–74	18–8	E. A. Diddle Arena; Bowling Green, KY
3/4/1976	(1)	(5) Middle Tennessee; Semifinals	W 88–78	19–8	E. A. Diddle Arena; Bowling Green, KY
3/5/1976	(1)	(4) Morehead State; Finals	W 65–60	20–8	E. A. Diddle Arena; Bowling Green, KY
1976 NCAA Division I Basketball Tournament
3/13/1976*		vs. No. 2 Marquette; Mideast Region First Round	L 60–79	20–9	UD Arena; Dayton, OH
*Non-conference game. ^{#}Rankings from AP Poll. (#) Tournament seedings in parentheses.
