= Isaiah Cozart =

American basketball player

No. 50 – SLUC Nancy Basket
- Position: Power forward
- League: LNB Pro A

Personal information
- Born: April 12, 2001 (age 25) Richmond, Kentucky, U.S.
- Listed height: 6 ft 7 in (2.01 m)
- Listed weight: 240 lb (109 kg)

Career information
- High school: Madison Central (Richmond, Kentucky)
- College: Western Kentucky (2019–2022); Eastern Kentucky (2022–2024)
- NBA draft: 2024: undrafted
- Playing career: 2024–present

Career history
- 2024–2025: Rasta Vechta
- 2025–present: SLUC Nancy Basket

Career highlights
- Atlantic Sun Player of the Year (2024); NCAA blocks leader (2024); First-team All-Atlantic Sun (2024); Atlantic Sun Defensive Player of the Year (2024)

Isaiah Cozart is an American professional basketball player for SLUC Nancy Basket of the LNB Pro A. He played college basketball for the Western Kentucky Hilltoppers and Eastern Kentucky Colonels.

== High school career ==
Cozart attended Madison Central High School in Richmond, Kentucky. During his senior season, he became the all-time leader in blocked shots in Kentucky high school basketball history. Cozart finished his senior season averaging 20 points, 12 rebounds, and six blocks per game, being named the Gatorade Boys Basketball Player of the Year for the state of Kentucky. A three-star recruit, he committed to play college basketball at Western Kentucky University.

== College career ==
Cozart played sparingly across his first three seasons, before entering the transfer portal. On April 25, 2022, he announced that he would be transferring to Eastern Kentucky University to play for the Eastern Kentucky Colonels. In his first season with Eastern Kentucky, he set the school's single season record for blocks. On November 27, 2023, Cozart tallied 10 points, 13 rebounds and 10 blocks, recording the first triple-double in school history. He finished the season averaging 15.5 points, 9.9 rebounds, and 3.9 blocks per game, while being named the Atlantic Sun Conference Player of the Year and Defensive Player of the Year.

== Professional career ==
On July 22, 2024, Cozart signed to play professionally for SC Rasta Vechta in the Basketball Bundesliga.

On July 4, 2025, he signed with SLUC Nancy Basket of the LNB Pro A.

== Career statistics ==
Legend
GP	Games played	GS	Games started	MPG	Minutes per game
FG%	Field goal percentage	3P%	3-point field goal percentage	FT%	Free throw percentage
RPG	Rebounds per game	APG	Assists per game	SPG	Steals per game
BPG	Blocks per game	PPG	Points per game	**Bold**	Career high

=== College ===
Year	Team	GP	GS	MPG	FG%	3P%	FT%	RPG	APG	SPG	BPG	PPG
2019–20	Western Kentucky	19	0	4.7	.538	.000	.000	.9	0.0	.1	.3	.7
2020–21	Western Kentucky	11	0	5.9	.643	.000	.000	2.0	.1	.1	.5	1.6
2021–22	Western Kentucky	18	0	6.1	.667	.000	.571	1.5	.0	.1	.6	1.3
2022–23	Eastern Kentucky	37	36	24.0	.635	.000	.564	7.5	.4	.5	2.5	9.9
2023–24	Eastern Kentucky	29	29	31.0	.658	.000	.542	9.9	.6	.6	3.9	15.5
