= Jamarion Sharp =

American basketball player (born 2001)

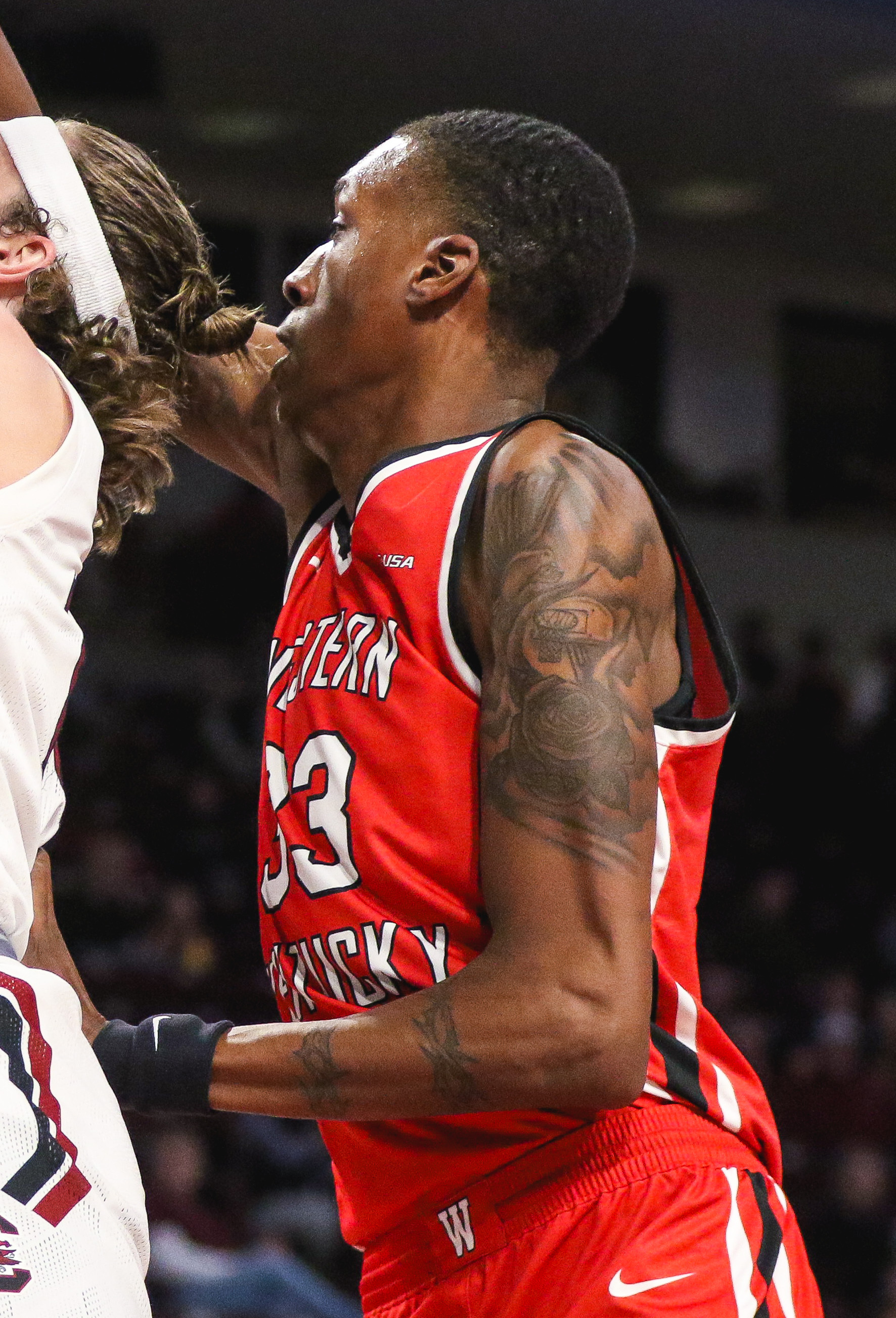
- Sharp with Western Kentucky in 2022

No. 33 – Raptors 905
- Position: Center
- League: NBA G League

Personal information
- Born: August 26, 2001 (age 25) Hopkinsville, Kentucky, U.S.
- Listed height: 7 ft 5 in (2.26 m)
- Listed weight: 235 lb (107 kg)

Career information
- High school: Hopkinsville (Hopkinsville, Kentucky)
- College: John A. Logan (2019–2021); Western Kentucky (2021–2023); Ole Miss (2023–2024)
- NBA draft: 2024: undrafted
- Playing career: 2024–present

Career history
- 2024–2026: Texas Legends
- 2025: NBA G League United
- 2026: Vaqueros de Bayamón
- 2026–present: Raptors 905

Career highlights
- NBA G League Defensive Player of the Year (2026); NBA G League All Defensive Team (2026); NBA G League blocks leader (2026); 2× NCAA blocks leader (2022, 2023); 2× Conference USA Defensive Player of the Year (2022, 2023); 2× All-GRAC (2020, 2021)
- Stats at NBA.com
- Stats at Basketball Reference

Jamarion Demontrez Sharp (born August 26, 2001) is an American professional basketball player for the Raptors 905 of the NBA G League. He played college basketball for the John A. Logan Volunteers, Western Kentucky Hilltoppers, and Ole Miss Rebels. At 7 ft 5 in (2.26 m), he was one of the tallest Division I players ever and is one of the tallest living humans.

== Early life ==
Sharp was born on August 26, 2001, in Hopkinsville, Kentucky. His father, Mario Sharp, was 6 ft 9 in (2.06 m) and his mother, Shiby Watkins, was 6 ft 5 in (1.96 m). He admits that "growing up, [he] didn’t love the game of basketball". Sharp's future high school coach, Tim Haworth, who knew him since he was five years old, encouraged him to play.

It really means a lot because growing up, I didn’t love the game of basketball, but Haworth, he made me keep getting in the gym more and more and made me start to love the game.

— Sharp explaining the influence his high school coach, Tim Haworth, had on him growing up.

Sharp had a growth spurt the summer after middle school and came into Hopkinsville High School as a 6 ft 6 in (1.98 m) freshman. He grew to 6 ft 8 in (2.03 m) by his junior year and became a seven-footer as a senior. He played basketball for the Tigers, where he appeared in the KHSAA Sweet Sixteen state tournament as a sophomore. As a junior, he averaged a modest 2.9 points and three rebounds per game. As a senior, he averaged 7.6 points and 7.9 rebounds per game, leading the Tigers to a 16–14 record and an 8th district semifinals appearance. He earned all-district honors and was selected to represent Team Kentucky in the 2019 Kentucky-Indiana All-Star game.

Western Kentucky head coach Rick Stansbury noticed Sharp, then a junior, in February 2018 while scouting another player. He caught Stansbury's attention during pre-game warm-ups but did not play in the first half. After Stansbury inquired about "the big kid", Haworth worked Sharp out in front of him at halftime by having him shoot jump hooks. Sharp was offered a scholarship "basically that night". However, he did not meet the academic requirements to attend Western Kentucky, his dream school, out of high school. On April 23, 2019, Sharp committed to John A. Logan College, a junior college in Carterville, Illinois.

== College career ==
=== John A. Logan ===
As a freshman for the John A. Logan Volunteers, Sharp was listed at 7 ft 2 in (2.18 m). He averaged 5.5 points, five rebounds and 3.7 blocks per game in his first year, earning All-Great Rivers Athletic Conference (GRAC) honors. While teaming with Jay Scrubb, they led the Volunteers to a 28–5 record and finished undefeated in conference play for the first time in school history. On January 28, 2021, Sharp recorded 20 points, 10 rebounds and six blocks in a double-overtime victory over Three Rivers. He recorded two triple-doubles in February against Kaskaskia College and Southwestern Illinois, including a season-high 12 blocks in the latter. As a sophomore, Sharp averaged 7.7 points, 7.3 rebounds and 5.3 blocks per game, earning All-GRAC and all-region honors.

Sharp was rated a four-star prospect and the top JUCO recruit in the nation by 247Sports. He received offers from programs such as Arizona, Cincinnati and Oregon, but committed to Western Kentucky on November 23, 2020.

=== Western Kentucky ===
By the time Sharp arrived at Western Kentucky for the 2021–22 season, he had grown to 7 ft 5 in (2.26 m). In his first game as a Hilltopper, an exhibition against Campbellsville, he recorded 14 points, seven rebounds and three blocks in 17 minutes. Sharp said of the experience that it was "amazing to play for [his] dream school." On November 24 he earned his first start in a 88–62 victory against Alabama A&M after Jaylen Butz was sidelined with knee soreness. In just his fifth game, he contributed 10 points, 12 rebounds, and 10 blocks, recording the third triple-double in program history and setting the program single-game blocks record. On December 4, he recorded 17 points, 14 rebounds and four blocks in a 85–80 victory over in-state rivals Eastern Kentucky. On December 11, he recorded 16 points, nine rebounds and six blocks in a 71–48 victory over Ole Miss at the Holiday Hoopsgiving in Atlanta. On December 18, he had 14 points, eight rebounds and four blocks in their 82–72 win over Louisville – the Hilltoppers' first win over the Cardinals since 2008. In their next game against Kentucky, he recorded eight points, six rebounds and seven blocks in the first half before exiting the game with an ankle sprain.

Sharp finished the season with averages of 8.3 points, 7.5 rebounds and a nation-leading 4.6 blocks per game while shooting 72.7 percent from the field. His 148 blocks set a new single-season program record, surpassing Chris Marcus's 97 blocks in 2000–01. Sharp was named Conference USA Defensive Player of the Year and an honorable mention all-conference selection. He was a semifinalist for the Naismith Defensive Player of the Year Award, as well as a finalist for the Lefty Driesell Award.

== Professional career ==
=== Texas Legends (2024–2025) ===
After going undrafted in the 2024 NBA draft, Sharp joined the Dallas Mavericks for the 2024 NBA Summer League and on August 3, 2024, he signed with the team. However, he was waived on October 18 and on October 26, he joined the Texas Legends. He played 29 games in the 2024–25 season, averaging 6.4 points, 7.2 rebounds and 3.2 blocks per game.

=== Return to the Texas Legends (2025–2026) ===
Sharp joined the Mavericks again for the 2025 NBA Summer League. On October 18, 2025, he was waived by the Mavericks after signing an Exhibit 10 contract. On March 20, 2026, Sharp had 18 points, 12 rebounds, and 8 blocks on a 110–103 loss to the Iowa Wolves. On April 2, 2026, Sharp won the Defensive Player of the Year for the 2025–2026 season.

=== Vaqueros de Bayamón (2026) ===
On April 1, 2026, Sharp signed with the reigning champions Vaqueros de Bayamón of the Baloncesto Superior Nacional. In his debut, he made history by becoming the tallest player to play in the Baloncesto Superior Nacional, taking the title from former NBA player Peter John Ramos (7’4”). His best performance came on April 5, 2026, when he recorded 10 points, 6 rebounds, and 4 blocks in a 86–79 victory over the Indios de Mayagüez. On April 23, 2026, Sharp departed Bayamón and was subsequently replaced by two-time NBA champion Damian Jones.

=== Raptors 905 (2026–present) ===
In July 2026, Sharp joined the Sacramento Kings for the California Classic portion of the 2026 NBA Summer League. He also played with Toronto Raptors in the Las Vegas Summer League, where he averaged 7.4 points, 7.4 rebounds, and 2.8 blocks per game.

On July 21, 2026, Sharp signed a two-way contract with the Los Angeles Clippers. He was waived by the Clippers on September 25, just prior to training camp.

On October 12, 2026, Sharp signed an Exhibit 10 contract with the Toronto Raptors. He was subsequently waived on October 17, following the preseason. On October 20, the Raptors 905 acquired his returning player rights from the Texas Legends in exchange for future draft picks. Sharp subsequently joined the Raptors 905 training camp roster ahead of the 2026–27 NBA G League season.

== Career statistics ==
Legend
GP	Games played	GS	Games started	MPG	Minutes per game
FG%	Field goal percentage	3P%	3-point field goal percentage	FT%	Free throw percentage
RPG	Rebounds per game	APG	Assists per game	SPG	Steals per game
BPG	Blocks per game	PPG	Points per game	**Bold**	Career high

=== College ===
Year	Team	GP	GS	MPG	FG%	3P%	FT%	RPG	APG	SPG	BPG	PPG
2019–20	John A. Logan	**33**	13	–	.641	.000	.380	5.0	.2	.3	3.7	5.5
2020–21	John A. Logan	24	16	–	.559	**.500**	**.582**	7.3	**.7**	.2	**5.8**	7.7
2021–22	Western Kentucky	32	28	28.0	**.726**	.000	.397	7.6	.3	.8	4.6	**8.2**
2022–23	Western Kentucky	32	**32**	**28.5**	.628	.000	.500	**7.7**	.2	**1.0**	4.1	7.4
2023–24	Ole Miss	31	15	15.8	.594	.000	.526	4.1	.6	.6	**2.4**	3.3
Career		152	104	24.2	.630	.125	.477	6.5	.4	.5	4.1	6.4

=== Baloncesto Superior Nacional ===
Year	Team	GP	GS	MPG	FG%	3P%	FT%	RPG	APG	SPG	BPG	PPG
2026	(Puerto Rico) Bayamón	5	1	13.3	.684	.000	.429	3.4	.2	.4	2.0	6.4

== Personal life ==
In April 2024, Sharp was charged with aggravated assault for firing a gun while a vehicle was being repossessed. No one was injured in the incident. Sharp was taken into custody and was given a $100,000 bond by a municipal court judge.
