= 1971–72 Western Kentucky Hilltoppers basketball team =

American college basketball season

1971–72 Western Kentucky Hilltoppers basketball

Ohio Valley Conference Co-Champion
- Conference: Ohio Valley Conference
- Record: 15–11 (9–5 OVC)
- Head coach: Jim Richards
- Home arena: E. A. Diddle Arena

The 1971–72 Western Kentucky Hilltoppers men's basketball team represented Western Kentucky University during the 1971–72 NCAA University Division men's basketball season. The Hilltoppers were led by new coach Jim Richards and All-Ohio Valley Conference player Jerry Dunn. WKU finished in a three-way tie for the OVC championship. No conference tournament was held, so a playoff was scheduled to determine which team would go on to the NCAA tournament. The Hilltoppers lost in the playoff to Morehead State.

== Schedule ==
Date time, TV	Opponent	Result	Record	Site city, state
OVC Playoff
3/7/1972	vs. Morehead State; OVC Playoff	L 79–82	15–11	Frankfort, KY
*Non-conference game. ^{#}Rankings from AP Poll. (#) Tournament seedings in parentheses.
