= 1953–54 Western Kentucky State Hilltoppers basketball team =

American college basketball season

1953–54 Western Kentucky State Hilltoppers basketball

OVC Tournament Champion Ohio Valley Conference Champion Kentucky Invitation Champion

NIT Tournament, Semifinals National 4th Place
- Conference: Ohio Valley Conference

Ranking
- Coaches: No. 6
- AP: No. 8
- Record: 29–3 (9–1 OVC)
- Head coach: Edgar Diddle (32nd season)
- Assistant coach: Ted Hornback
- Home arena: Health & Physical Education Building

The 1953–54 Western Kentucky State Hilltoppers men's basketball team represented Western Kentucky State College (now known as Western Kentucky University) during the 1953-54 NCAA University Division Basketball season. The Hilltoppers were led by future Naismith Memorial Basketball Hall of Fame coach Edgar Diddle and consensus All-American, Tom Marshall. The Hilltoppers won the Ohio Valley Conference championship, and were invited to the 1954 National Invitation Tournament, where they were seeded as the number 2 team and advanced to the semifinals. For the NIT consolation game against fourth seeded Niagara, Coach Diddle looked to build experience for the next year's team, only allowing his freshman and sophomores to play. During this period, the NIT was considered on par with the NCAA tournament. This was one of the finest teams in Western Kentucky history, they led the NCAA in wins and Marshall averaged more than 25 points and nearly 15 rebounds per game, setting school records for scoring and rebounding. Art Spoelstra, Jack Turner and Lynn Cole joined Marshall on the All-Conference and OVC Tournament teams.

== Schedule ==
Date time, TV	Rank^{#}	Opponent^{#}	Result	Record	Site city, state
Regular Season
11/25/1953*		at Belmont	W 108–75	1–0	Nashville, TN
11/28/1953*		at Kentucky Wesleyan	W 86–74	2–0	Owensboro Sportscenter; Owensboro, KY
12/4/1953*		Gustavus Adolphus	W 90–73	3–0	Health & Phys Ed Building; Bowling Green, KY
12/5/1953*		Southeastern Louisiana	W 84–60	4–0	Health & Phys Ed Building; Bowling Green, KY
12/8/1953	No. 11	at Middle Tennessee	W 88–80	5–0 (1-0)	Alumni Memorial Gym; Murfreesboro, TN
12/12/1953	No. 11	Morehead State	W 98–77	6–0 (2-0)	Health & Phys Ed Building; Bowling Green, KY
12/15/1953*	No. 10	at Cincinnati	W 74–71	7–0	Cincinnati Gardens; Cincinnati, OH
12/17/1953*	No. 10	vs. Saint Francis (NY)	W 97–67	8–0	Madison Square Garden; New York, NY
12/19/1953*	No. 10	vs. St. Bonaventure	W 82–76	9–0	Butler Memorial Gym; Buffalo, NY
12/28/1953*	No. 6	vs. Houston; Kentucky Invitation Tournament	W 91–61	10–0	Jefferson County Armory; Louisville, KY
12/29/1953	No. 7	vs. Eastern Kentucky; Kentucky Invitation Tournament	W 81–78	11–0	Jefferson County Armory; Louisville, KY
12/30/1953*	No. 7	at Louisville; Kentucky Invitation Tournament	W 89–71	12–0	Jefferson County Armory; Louisville, KY
1/5/1954	No. 5	Middle Tennessee	W 98–67	13–0 (3-0)	Health & Phys Ed Building; Bowling Green, KY
1/9/1954	No. 5	at Murray State	W 57–43	14–0 (4-0)	Carr Health Building; Murray, KY
1/13/1954*	No. 5	at No. 17 Dayton	W 79–75 ^{3OT}	15–0	The Frericks Center; Dayton, OH
1/16/1954	No. 5	Eastern Kentucky	W 122–78	16–0 (5-0)	Health & Phys Ed Building; Bowling Green, KY
1/20/1954	No. 4	at Tennessee Tech	W 62–51	17–0 (6-0)	Memorial Gymnasium; Cookeville, TN
1/23/1954*	No. 4	at Memphis State	W 63–53	18–0	Memorial Fieldhouse; Memphis, TN
1/29/1954*	No. 4	Regis	W 87–72	19–0	Health & Phys Ed Building; Bowling Green, KY
2/1/1954*	No. 4	vs. Bowling Green State	W 94–82	20–0	Jefferson County Armory; Louisville, KY
2/4/1954*	No. 4	at Stetson	W 81–63	21–0	Health & Phys Ed Building; Bowling Green, KY
2/6/1954	No. 4	at Eastern Kentucky	L 54–63	21–1 (6-1)	Weaver Gymnasium; Richmond, KY
2/8/1954	No. 4	at Morehead State	W 88–75	22–1 (7-1)	Button Auditorium; Morehead, KY
2/13/1954	No. 5	Murray State	W 104–68	23–1 (8-1)	Health & Phys Ed Building; Bowling Green, KY
2/15/1954*	No. 5	Kentucky Wesleyan	W 81–65	24–1	Health & Phys Ed Building; Bowling Green, KY
2/20/1954	No. 4	Tennessee Tech	W 108–63	25–1 (9-1)	Health & Phys Ed Building; Bowling Green, KY
2/22/1954*	No. 4	Cincinnati	W 92–77	26–1	Health & Phys Ed Building; Bowling Green, KY
1954 Ohio Valley Conference Tournament
2/25/1954	No. 4	vs. Morehead State; OVC Tournament Semifinal	W 97–79	27–1	Jefferson County Armory; Louisville, KY
2/26/1954	No. 4	vs. Eastern Kentucky; OVC Tournament Final	W 85–69	28–1	Jefferson County Armory; Louisville, KY
1954 National Invitation Tournament
3/8/1954*	No. 3 (N2)	vs. Bowling Green State; NIT Quarterfinal	W 95–81	29–1	Madison Square Garden; New York, NY
3/11/1954*	No. 4 (N2)	vs. No. 6 (N3) Holy Cross; NIT Semifinal	L 69–75	29–2	Madison Square Garden; New York, NY
3/13/1954*	No. 4 (N2)	vs. No. 16 (N4) Niagara; NIT Consolation	L 65–71	29–3	Madison Square Garden; New York, NY
*Non-conference game. ^{#}Rankings from AP Poll. (#) Tournament seedings in parentheses.
