= 1954–55 Western Kentucky State Hilltoppers basketball team =

American college basketball season

1954–55 Western Kentucky State Hilltoppers basketball

Ohio Valley Conference Champion
- Conference: Ohio Valley Conference
- Record: 18–10 (8–2 OVC)
- Head coach: Edgar Diddle (33rd season)
- Assistant coach: Ted Hornback
- Home arena: Health & Physical Education Building

The 1954–55 Western Kentucky State Hilltoppers men's basketball team represented Western Kentucky State College (now known as Western Kentucky University) during the 1954-55 NCAA University Division Basketball season. The Hilltoppers were led by future Naismith Memorial Basketball Hall of Fame coach Edgar Diddle. Western won the Ohio Valley Conference season championship but lost in the semifinals of the conference tournament. Ralph Crosthwaite and Forest Able were named to the All-Conference and OVC Tournament teams.

== Schedule ==
Date time, TV	Opponent	Result	Record	Site city, state
1955 Ohio Valley Conference Tournament
2/24/1955	vs. Tennessee Tech; OVC Tournament	W 80–65	18–9	Jefferson County Armory; Louisville, KY
2/25/1955	vs. Murray State; OVC Tournament Semifinal	L 72–77	18–10	Jefferson County Armory; Louisville, KY
*Non-conference game. ^{#}Rankings from AP Poll. (#) Tournament seedings in parentheses.
