= 1952–53 Western Kentucky State Hilltoppers basketball team =

American college basketball season

1952–53 Western Kentucky State Hilltoppers basketball

OVC Tournament Champion

NIT Tournament, Quarterfinals
- Conference: Ohio Valley Conference

Ranking
- Coaches: No. 11
- AP: No. 17
- Record: 25–6 (8–2 OVC)
- Head coach: Edgar Diddle (31st season)
- Assistant coach: Ted Hornback
- Home arena: Health & Physical Education Building

The 1952–53 Western Kentucky State Hilltoppers men's basketball team represented Western Kentucky State College (now known as Western Kentucky University) during the 1952-53 NCAA University Division Basketball season. The Hilltoppers were led by future Naismith Memorial Basketball Hall of Fame coach Edgar Diddle and All-American player Tom Marshall. The Hilltoppers won the Ohio Valley Conference tournament and were invited to the 1953 National Invitation Tournament. During this period, the NIT was considered on par with the NCAA tournament. Art Spoelstra joined Marshall on the All-Conference and OVC Tournament teams.

== Schedule ==
Date time, TV	Rank^{#}	Opponent^{#}	Result	Record	Site city, state
Regular Season
11/29/1952*		at Kentucky Wesleyan	W 76–62	1–0	Owensboro Sportscenter; Owensboro, KY
12/2/1952		at Middle Tennessee	W 87–57	2–0 (1-0)	Alumni Memorial Gym; Murfreesboro, TN
12/8/1952		Morehead State	W 56–33	3–0 (2-0)	Health & Phys Ed Building; Bowling Green, KY
12/13/1952		at Morehead State	W 79–66	4–0 (3-0)	Button Auditorium; Morehead, KY
12/16/1952*	No. 11	at Cincinnati	W 77–76	5–0	Cincinnati Gardens; Cincinnati, OH
12/18/1952*	No. 11	vs. No. 4 Seton Hall	L 74–77	5–1	Madison Square Garden; New York, NY
12/20/1952*	No. 11	at Saint Joseph's (PA)	W 88–83	6–1	Alumni Memorial Fieldhouse; Philadelphia, PA
12/29/1952*	No. 10	vs. No. 20 Idaho; All-College Tournament	L 60–75	6–2	Oklahoma City, OK
12/30/1952*	No. 10	vs. No. 8 Tulsa; All-College Tournament	W 79–70	7–2	Oklahoma City, OK
12/31/1952*	No. 10	vs. Penn State; All-College Tournament	W 91–78	8–2	Oklahoma City, OK
1/3/1953*	No. 10	vs. No. 15 St. Bonaventure	W 94–63	9–2	Jefferson County Armory; Louisville, KY
1/8/1953*	No. 10	Cincinnati	W 84–76	10–2	Health & Phys Ed Building; Bowling Green, KY
1/10/1953	No. 10	Murray State	W 62–57	11–2 (4-0)	Health & Phys Ed Building; Bowling Green, KY
1/13/1953	No. 10	Tennessee Tech	W 99–61	12–2 (5-0)	Health & Phys Ed Building; Bowling Green, KY
1/17/1953	No. 10	at Eastern Kentucky	L 69–78	12–3 (5-1)	Weaver Gymnasium; Richmond, KY
1/22/1953*	No. 12	at Miami	W 98–56	13–3	Miami, FL
1/24/1953*	No. 12	at Loyola (LA)	W 84–75	14–3	New Orleans, LA
1/26/1953*	No. 12	Tampa	W 117–58	15–3	Health & Phys Ed Building; Bowling Green, KY
1/31/1953*	No. 9	Tampa	W 104–56	16–3	Health & Phys Ed Building; Bowling Green, KY
2/2/1953*	No. 9	Bowling Green State	W 71–60	17–3	Health & Phys Ed Building; Bowling Green, KY
2/4/1953*	No. 8	Dayton	W 88–77	18–3	Health & Phys Ed Building; Bowling Green, KY
2/7/1953	No. 8	No. 15 Eastern Kentucky	W 86–76	19–3 (6-1)	Health & Phys Ed Building; Bowling Green, KY
2/9/1953*	No. 8	Loyola (LA)	W 92–67	20–3	Health & Phys Ed Building; Bowling Green, KY
2/14/1953	No. 9	at Murray State	L 67–77	20–4 (6-2)	Carr Health Building; Murray, KY
2/17/1953	No. 9	Middle Tennessee	W 95–57	21–4 (7-2)	Health & Phys Ed Building; Bowling Green, KY
2/19/1953	No. 9	at Tennessee Tech	W 74–61	22–4 (8-2)	Memorial Gymnasium; Cookeville, TN
2/21/1953*	No. 9	Kentucky Wesleyan	W 108–69	23–4	Health & Phys Ed Building; Bowling Green, KY
2/23/1953*	No. 8	vs. Bowling Green State	L 82–86	23–5	Bowling Green, OH
1953 Ohio Valley Conference Tournament
2/27/1953	No. 8	vs. Morehead State; OVC Tournament Semifinal	W 76–65	24–5	Jefferson County Armory; Louisville, KY
2/28/1953	No. 8	vs. No. 20 Eastern Kentucky; OVC Tournament Final	W 70–60	25–5	Jefferson County Armory; Louisville, KY
1953 National Invitation Tournament
3/10/1953*	No. 9	vs. No. 11 Duquesne; NIT Quarterfinal	L 61–69	25–6	Madison Square Garden; New York, NY
*Non-conference game. ^{#}Rankings from AP Poll. (#) Tournament seedings in parentheses.
