= 2003 Sun Belt Conference men's basketball tournament =

- Classification: Division I
- Season: 2002–03
- Teams: 11
- Site: E. A. Diddle Arena; Bowling Green, KY
- Champions: Western Kentucky (5th title)
- Winning coach: Dennis Felton (3rd title)
- MVP: Patrick Sparks (Western Kentucky)

2002–03 Sun Belt Conference men's basketball standings
	Conf.				Overall
Team	W		L	PCT	W		L	PCT
East
Western Kentucky †	12	–	2	.857	24	–	9	.727
Middle Tennessee	9	–	5	.643	16	–	14	.533
Arkansas-Little Rock	8	–	6	.571	18	–	12	.600
Arkansas State	6	–	8	.429	13	–	15	.464
Florida International	1	–	13	.071	8	–	21	.276
West
Louisiana–Lafayette	12	–	3	.800	20	–	10	.667
New Mexico State	9	–	6	.600	20	–	9	.690
South Alabama	7	–	8	.467	14	–	14	.500
New Orleans	7	–	8	.467	15	–	14	.517
Denver	7	–	8	.467	17	–	15	.531
North Texas	2	–	13	.133	7	–	21	.250
† 2003 Sun Belt Conference tournament winner Rankings from AP poll

The 2003 Sun Belt Conference men's basketball tournament was held March 7–11 at E. A. Diddle Arena in Bowling Green, Kentucky.

The top-seed in the East division Western Kentucky defeated West division #2 seed Middle Tennessee in the championship game, 64–52, to win their fifth Sun Belt men's basketball tournament.

The Hilltoppers, in turn, received an automatic bid to the 2003 NCAA tournament as the #13 seed in the West region. No other Sun Belt members earned bids to the tournament.

== Format ==
All eleven participating Sun Belt members were seeded based on regular season conference records, with the five highest-seeded teams were awarded byes into the quarterfinal round while the six lowest-seeded teams entered the bracket in the preliminary first round.

== Bracket ==
First round Friday, March 7
5E	Florida International	62
4W	New Orleans	45
6W	North Texas	73
3E	Arkansas–Little Rock	74
4E	Arkansas State	76
5W	Denver	82

Quarterfinals; Saturday, March 8 Sunday, March 9
1E	Western Kentucky	71
5E	Florida International	60
3E	Arkansas–Little Rock	61
2W	New Mexico State	78
2E	Middle Tennessee	72
3W	South Alabama	69
5W	Denver	72
1W	Louisiana–Lafayette	68

Semifinals; Monday, March 10
1E	Western Kentucky	78
2W	New Mexico State	59
2E	Middle Tennessee	83
5W	Denver	59

Championship; Tuesday, March 11
1E	Western Kentucky	64
2E	Middle Tennessee	52

== See also ==
- Sun Belt Conference women's basketball tournament
