= Chris Marcus =

American basketball player (1979–2020)

Personal information
- Born: December 11, 1979 Chicago, Illinois, U.S.
- Died: April 23, 2020 (aged 40) Charlotte, North Carolina, U.S.
- Listed height: 7 ft 1 in (2.16 m)
- Listed weight: 300 lb (136 kg)

Career information
- High school: Olympic (Charlotte, North Carolina)
- College: Western Kentucky (1999–2003)
- NBA draft: 2003: undrafted
- Position: Center
- Number: 1

Career highlights
- NCAA rebounding leader (2001); Sun Belt Player of the Year (2001); 2× All-Sun Belt (2000, 2001); Sun Belt Defensive Player of the Year (2000); Sun Belt Newcomer of the Year (2000)

Christopher Lee Marcus (December 11, 1979 – April 23, 2020) was an American basketball player, best known for his collegiate career at Western Kentucky University between 1999–2000 and 2002–03.

== Early life ==
Marcus was born in Chicago, Illinois but raised in Charlotte, North Carolina. He grew extremely quickly; by sixth grade he was 6 ft 1 in (1.85 m), in seventh he was 6 ft 3 in (1.91 m), and in eighth grade Marcus stood 6 ft 4 in (1.93 m) tall. By the time he was soundly into his high school career, Marcus was a certified seven-footer. However, he did not begin playing basketball until the school's new head coach, David Davis, convinced him to play for the team.

After former Clemson coach Dennis Felton became head coach at Western Kentucky, he recruited Marcus to play for him.

== Career ==
As a true freshman in 1998–99 at Western Kentucky University, Marcus did not play basketball in order to focus on his grades. When Marcus started playing for the team, he averaged 11.5 points and 9.5 rebounds per game en route to being named the Sun Belt Newcomer of the Year and Defender of the Year.

The following season, Marcus's sophomore season, he led the Hilltoppers in scoring at 16.7 points per game, and his 12.1 rebounds per game led all of NCAA Division I. Western Kentucky compiled a 24–7 record, winning the Sun Belt regular season and conference tournament championships, on their way to an NCAA Tournament berth.

During Marcus's last two years at WKU, a pre-season injury to his ankle sidelined him for months during his junior year. After rushing his rehabilitation, Marcus only lasted half of his senior season before he returned to Charlotte. During his final two years of college, Marcus developed an addiction to alcohol.

Marcus participated in the Denver Nuggets training camp, but never played a game in the NBA.

=== Awards and honors ===
- Sun Belt Newcomer of the Year (1999–00)
- Sun Belt Defensive Player of the Year (1999–00)
- Sun Belt Tournament MVP (2000–01)
- NCAA rebounding leader (2000–01)
- Sun Belt Conference Men's Basketball Player of the Year (2000–01)
- 2× Associated Press Honorable Mention All-American (2000–01, 2001–02)
- Lindy's College Basketball All-America Team (2001)

== Personal life ==
Marcus joined Alcoholics Anonymous (AA) in 2005 and overcame his addiction to alcohol. He remained active in AA for the rest of his life and had a career as a counselor for children with disabilities or behavioral issues, declining offers to return to basketball as a coach.

Marcus died on April 23, 2020, in Charlotte, North Carolina from a pulmonary embolism.
