= Dennis Felton =

American basketball coach

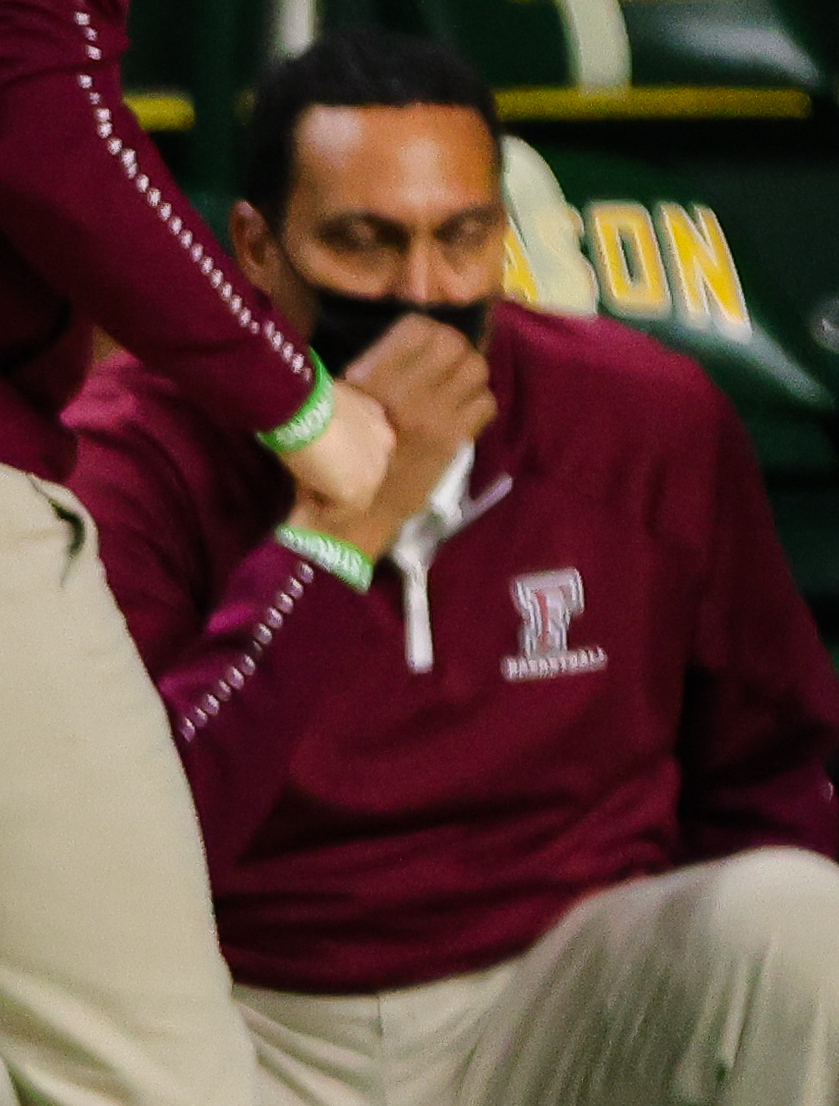
- Felton in 2021

Biographical details
- Born: June 21, 1963 (age 63); Tokyo, Japan

Playing career
- 1981–1983: Prince George's CC
- 1983–1985: Howard

Coaching career (HC unless noted)
- 1984: Oxon Hill HS (assistant)
- 1985–1986: Charles County CC (assistant)
- 1986–1990: Delaware (assistant)
- 1990–1991: Tulane (assistant)
- 1991–1992: Saint Joseph's (assistant)
- 1992–1994: Providence (assistant)
- 1994–1998: Clemson (assistant)
- 1998–2003: Western Kentucky
- 2003–2009: Georgia
- 2014–2017: Tulsa (assistant)
- 2017–2019: Cleveland State
- 2019–2021: Fordham (assistant)
- 2021–2023: George Mason (associate HC)
- 2023–2026: Providence (assistant)

Head coaching record
- Overall: 206–189
- Tournaments: 0–4 (NCAA Division I); 1–2 (NIT)

Accomplishments and honors

Championships
- 3 Sun Belt regular season (2001–2003); 3 Sun Belt tournament (2001–2003); SEC tournament (2008)

Awards
- Sun Belt Coach of the Year (2002)

Dennis Alan Felton (born June 21, 1963) is an American basketball coach. His previous positions included stints at George Mason University and Providence College under Kim English, and an assistant role at Fordham University. He is also the former head men's basketball coach at the University of Georgia, Western Kentucky University, and Cleveland State, and also served as a player personnel assistant for the National Basketball Association's San Antonio Spurs.

Felton was born in Tokyo, Japan and spent his early years living in and visiting a variety of locales around the world, due to his father's career in the United States Air Force. His family eventually moved to Clinton, Maryland, a suburban town in the Washington, D.C., area, a short distance from Andrews Air Force Base. Felton graduated from Surrattsville High School in 1981 and went on to Prince George's Community College. He completed his athletic and academic careers at Howard University in 1985, where he was a Mid-Eastern Athletic Conference All-Academic selection.

== College coaching ==
Felton got his start in the coaching profession as an assistant basketball coach at Oxon Hill High School in 1984. He then became an assistant coach at Charles County Community College, for one season (1985–86) before moving on to University of Delaware as an assistant coach for four seasons (1986–90). Felton continued his collegiate career with one season each at Tulane University and St. Joseph's University. In 1992, he took an assistant's post at Providence College under Rick Barnes. That season began a 6-year apprenticeship with Barnes that included two with the Friars and four at Clemson University (1994–98). The six teams that Barnes and Felton coached together all posted winning seasons (including three 20-win campaigns), all played in the postseason (four NCAA berths, two in the NIT) and went 114–71, averaging 19 wins per year.

=== Western Kentucky ===
In the spring of 1998, just before Barnes left Clemson for Texas, Felton was named the head coach at Western Kentucky University. His first two Hilltopper squads went a combined 24–34. The 1999 team advanced to the Sun Belt Tournament title game. His Hilltopper teams won the Sun Belt Conference tournament titles in 2001, 2002, and 2003.

=== Georgia ===
In April 2003 Felton was hired as the head coach at the University of Georgia. Felton also took assistant coaches Bert Tucker and Ken McDonald as well as associate head coach Pete Herrmann with him to Athens.

In his first four seasons at Georgia, Felton had compiled a 58–63 record with two NIT appearances while attempting to lead Georgia back from the severe disadvantages that previous coach Jim Harrick dealt the program. Despite having only 9 scholarship players in 2007–2008, Felton's Bulldogs completed a successful run in SEC tournament championship history. Entering the 2008 SEC men's basketball tournament as the lowest seed, Georgia won 4 games in 3 days to capture the conference tournament crown and the corresponding automatic berth in the 2008 NCAA men's basketball tournament. In their first NCAA Tournament appearance since 2002, the Bulldogs were defeated by Xavier University in the first round in Washington, D.C.

On January 29, 2009, Dennis Felton was fired as head coach of the UGA Men's Basketball team. This came with a losing streak that left the team with a 9–11 record in mid-season. He finished his career as the coach of UGA Men's Basketball team with an 84–91 record. Associate head coach Pete Herrmann finished the 2008–2009 season as the interim head coach.

=== Tulsa ===
Felton returned to college coaching after stints in the NBA, as an assistant coach on Frank Haith's staff at Tulsa.

=== Cleveland State ===
On March 24, 2017, Felton was hired as the head coach of Cleveland State University. On March 27, 2017 Felton was officially introduced as head coach. Felton's contract was for five years. On July 12, 2019, he was fired, along with his entire coaching staff.

=== Fordham ===
In 2019, Felton was hired as an assistant coach at Fordham University.

=== George Mason ===
In 2021, Felton was hired by Kim English to be the associate head coach at George Mason University. The Patriots went 34-29 in their two years on the staff.

=== Providence (second stint) ===
Felton, who coached at Providence College from 1992–94, returned to the Friars' coaching staff as an assistant in 2023, following English when he was named Providence's head coach in March.

== NBA coaching career ==
During the 2009–2010 NBA season, Felton served on the scouting staff for the Phoenix Suns, mainly observing NCAA games in the Southeast. He was also a part of the Suns' war room during the NBA draft in June 2010, led by General Manager Steve Kerr and head coach Alvin Gentry.

On June 28, 2010, the New Jersey Nets announced that Felton would be an assistant coach for their Summer League team.

Prior to the start of the 2010–2011 NBA season, he was hired by the San Antonio Spurs as Director of Pro Player Personnel, a position he held through 2013.

== Head coaching record ==
Record table
Season	Team	Overall	Conference	Standing	Postseason
Western Kentucky Hilltoppers (Sun Belt Conference) (1998–2003)
1998–99	Western Kentucky	13–16	7–7	T–3rd	
1999–00	Western Kentucky	11–18	8–8	5th	
2000–01	Western Kentucky	24–7	14–2	1st (East)	NCAA Division I First Round
2001–02	Western Kentucky	28–4	13–1	1st (East)	NCAA Division I First Round
2002–03	Western Kentucky	24–9	12–2	1st (East)	NCAA Division I First Round
Western Kentucky:		100–54 (.649)	54–20 (.730)		
Georgia Bulldogs (Southeastern Conference) (2003–2009)
2003–04	Georgia	16–14	7–9	T–8th	NIT First Round
2004–05	Georgia	8–20	2–14	12th	
2005–06	Georgia	15–15	5–11	10th	
2006–07	Georgia	19–14	8–8	T–5th	NIT Second Round
2007–08	Georgia	17–17	4–12	11th	NCAA Division I First Round
2008–09	Georgia	9–11	0–5		
Georgia:		84–91 (.480)	26–59 (.306)		
Cleveland State Vikings (Horizon League) (2017–2019)
2017–18	Cleveland State	12–23	6–12	T–8th	
2018–19	Cleveland State	10–21	5–13	9th	
Cleveland State:		22–44 (.333)	11–25 (.306)		
Total:		206–189 (.522)			
National champion Postseason invitational champion Conference regular season champion Conference regular season and conference tournament champion Division regular season champion Division regular season and conference tournament champion Conference tournament champion

== Personal ==
Felton is married to the former Melanie Smith, who is also a Howard alumna. The couple reside in Milton, Georgia with their two sons, Jazz and Nile. Jazz and Nile are both basketball players. Jazz was a part of Milton High School's state championship team as a freshman in 2009–2010. Jazz will attend WKU and will serve on Ray Harper's coaching staff.
