= 2020–21 Western Kentucky Hilltoppers basketball team =

American college basketball season

2020–21 Western Kentucky Hilltoppers basketball

C-USA regular season champions C-USA East division champions

NIT, Quarterfinals
- Conference: Conference USA
- East Division
- Record: 21–8 (11–3 C-USA)
- Head coach: Rick Stansbury (5th season)
- Assistant coaches: Hennssy Auriantal; Phil Cunningham; Marcus Grant
- Home arena: E. A. Diddle Arena

2020–21 Conference USA men's basketball standings
	Conf.				Overall
Team	W		L	PCT	W		L	PCT
East
Western Kentucky	11	–	3	.786	21	–	8	.724
Old Dominion	11	–	5	.688	15	–	8	.652
Marshall	9	–	5	.643	15	–	7	.682
Florida Atlantic	7	–	5	.583	13	–	10	.565
Charlotte	5	–	11	.313	9	–	15	.375
Middle Tennessee	3	–	13	.188	5	–	18	.217
FIU	2	–	15	.118	9	–	17	.346
West
Louisiana Tech	12	–	4	.750	24	–	8	.750
UAB	13	–	5	.722	22	–	7	.759
North Texas †	9	–	5	.643	18	–	10	.643
UTSA	9	–	7	.563	15	–	11	.577
UTEP	8	–	8	.500	12	–	12	.500
Rice	6	–	10	.375	15	–	13	.536
Southern Miss	4	–	13	.235	8	–	17	.320
† 2021 C-USA Tournament winner

The 2020–21 Western Kentucky Hilltoppers men's basketball team represented Western Kentucky University during the 2020–21 NCAA Division I men's basketball season. The Hilltoppers were led by head coach Rick Stansbury in his fifth season and played their home games at E. A. Diddle Arena in Bowling Green, Kentucky as seventh-year members of Conference USA. The team finished the season in first place in the C-USA East Division and with the best conference record overall at 18–6 . They defeated UTSA and UAB to advance to the finals where they lost to North Texas. They received a bid to the 2021 National Invitation Tournament where they defeated Saint Mary's in the First Round before losing to fellow conference member Louisiana Tech in the quarterfinals. Center Charles Bassey was named the Conference USA Player of the Year, and Defensive Player of the Year. Taveion Hollingsworth joined Bassey on the All-Conference Team, while Josh Anderson joined him on C-USA's All-Defensive Team, and Dayvion McKnight made the All-Freshman Team.

== Previous season ==
The Hilltoppers finished the 2019–20 season with 20–10, 13–5 in C-USA play to finish in second place. The 2020 Conference USA men's basketball tournament, and the remainder of the season was cancelled due to the COVID-19 pandemic.

== Roster ==
2020–21 WKU Hilltoppers men's basketball team
Players
Coaches

Pos.	#	Name	Height	Weight	Year	Previous school	Hometown
G	1	Kylen Milton	6 ft 4 in (1.93 m)	190 lb (86 kg)	Fr	Conway HS; Core4 Academy	Monticello, AR
F	2	Kevin Osawe	6 ft 6 in (1.98 m)	205 lb (93 kg)	Jr	Central Technical School; Vincennes	Toronto, Ontario, Canada
G	3	Jordan Rawls	6 ft 1 in (1.85 m)	180 lb (82 kg)	So	Hamilton Heights Christian Academy	Chattanooga, TN
G	4	Josh Anderson	6 ft 6 in (1.98 m)	190 lb (86 kg)	Sr	Madison Preparatory Academy	Baton Rouge, LA
G	5	Noah Stansbury	6 ft 0 in (1.83 m)	160 lb (73 kg)	Fr	Greenwood HS	Bowling Green, KY
G	11	Taveion Hollingsworth	6 ft 2 in (1.88 m)	165 lb (75 kg)	Sr	Paul Laurence Dunbar HS	Lexington, KY
G	12	Jackson Harlan	6 ft 3 in (1.91 m)	190 lb (86 kg)	So	Clinton County HS	Albany, KY
G	14	Luke Frampton	6 ft 5 in (1.96 m)	200 lb (91 kg)	RS Jr	Poca HS; Davidson	Poca, WV
G	15	Patrick Murphy	6 ft 5 in (1.96 m)	180 lb (82 kg)	RS Sr	Independence HS; Martin Methodist	Franklin, TN
G	20	Dayvion McKnight	6 ft 1 in (1.85 m)	190 lb (86 kg)	Fr	Collins HS	Shelvyville, KY
G	21	Kenny Cooper	6 ft 0 in (1.83 m)	190 lb (86 kg)	RS Sr	Franklin Road Academy; Lipscomb	Nashville, TN
F	22	Carson Williams	6 ft 5 in (1.96 m)	240 lb (109 kg)	RS Sr	Owen County HS; Northern Kentucky	Owenton, KY
C	23	Charles Bassey	6 ft 11 in (2.11 m)	235 lb (107 kg)	Jr	St. Anthony Catholic HS; Aspire Academy	Lagos, Nigeria
F	32	Bailey Conrad	6 ft 7 in (2.01 m)	220 lb (100 kg)	Fr	Christian Academy of Indiana	Corydon, IN
F	50	Isaiah Cozart	6 ft 7 in (2.01 m)	235 lb (107 kg)	So	Madison Central HS	Richmond, KY

Head coach

- Rick Stansbury (Campbellsville)

Assistant coach(es)

- Hennssy Auriantal (Wisconsin)
- Phil Cunningham (Campbellsville)
- Marcus Grant (Mississippi State)

Legend

- (C) Team captain
- (S) Suspended
- (I) Ineligible
- (W) Walk-on
- Injured
- Current redshirt

Roster
Last update: January 31, 2021

== Schedule ==
Date time, TV	Rank^{#}	Opponent^{#}	Result	Record	High points	High rebounds	High assists	Site (attendance) city, state
Regular season
November 25, 2020*; 3:30 p.m., ESPNU		vs. Northern Iowa; Crossover Classic quarterfinals	W 93–87	1–0	26 – Hollingsworth	8 – Bassey	3 – McKnight	Sanford Pentagon (0); Sioux Falls, SD
November 26, 2020*; 11:00 a.m., ESPN		vs. Memphis; Crossover Classic semifinals	W 75–69	2–0	21 – Bassey	14 – Bassey	4 – Cooper	Sanford Pentagon (0); Sioux Falls, SD
November 27, 2020*; 12:30 p.m., ESPN		vs. No. 15 West Virginia; Crossover Classic championship	L 64–70	2–1	15 – Bassey	8 – Bassey	3 – Hollingsworth	Sanford Pentagon (0); Sioux Falls, SD
December 1, 2020*; 5:00 p.m., ACCN		at No. 24 Louisville; Wade Houston Tip-Off Classic	L 54–75	2–2	19 – Hollingsworth	15 – Bassey	3 – McKnight	KFC Yum! Center (3,013); Louisville, KY
December 6, 2020*; 2:00 p.m., ESPN+		Mississippi Valley State	W 96–69	3–2	16 – Hollingsworth	11 – Bassey	7 – McKnight	Diddle Arena (1,009); Bowling Green, KY
December 10, 2020*; 7:00 p.m., ESPN+		Gardner–Webb	W 86–84	4–2	29 – Bassey	14 – Bassey	7 – Cooper	Diddle Arena (1,009); Bowling Green, KY
December 13, 2020*; 11:00 a.m., CBSSN		Rhode Island	W 68–65	5–2	15 – Anderson	9 – Bassey	7 – Hollingsworth	Diddle Arena (1,070); Bowling Green, KY
December 19, 2020*; 1:00 p.m., SECN		at Alabama	W 73–71	6–2	27 – Bassey	12 – Bassey	6 – McKnight	Coleman Coliseum (2,025); Tuscaloosa, AL
December 22, 2020*; 6:00 p.m., ESPNU		Tennessee Tech	W 88–68	7–2	22 – Frampton	7 – Hollingsworth	4 – Anderson, Cooper, McKnight	Diddle Arena; Bowling Green, KY
January 1, 2021; 3:30 p.m., FS South		at Charlotte	W 67–63	8–2 (1–0)	14 – Hollingsworth	12 – Bassey	6 – McKnight	Dale F. Halton Arena; Charlotte, North Carolina
January 2, 2021; 3:30 p.m., Stadium		at Charlotte	L 71–75 ^{OT}	8–3 (1–1)	23 – Hollingsworth	8 – Bassey	3 – Hollingsworth, Cooper	Dale F. Halton Arena; Charlotte, NC
January 8, 2021; 7:00 p.m., CBSSN on Facebook		Louisiana Tech	W 66–64	9–3 (2–1)	24 – Bassey	12 – Bassey	4 – Rawls	Diddle Arena (1,102); Bowling Green, KY
January 9, 2021; 6:00 p.m., CBSSN on Facebook		Louisiana Tech	L 58–63	9–4 (2–2)	16 – Hollingsworth	13 – Bassey	6 – McKnight	Diddle Arena (1,123); Bowling Green, KY
January 14, 2021; 6:00 p.m., CBSSN		Marshall	W 81–73	10–4 (3–2)	22 – Anderson	19 – Bassey	4 – Hollingsworth	Diddle Arena (1,117); Bowling Green, KY
January 17, 2021; 2:00 p.m., CBSSN on Facebook		at Marshall	W 69–67	11–4 (4–2)	24 – Bassey	9 – Bassey	2 – Williams, McKnight, Cooper	Cam Henderson Center (1,274); Huntington, West Virginia
January 23, 2021; 4:00 p.m., ESPN+		at Middle Tennessee	W 82–67	12–4 (5–2)	16 – Bassey	12 – Bassey	4 – McKnight	Murphy Center; Murfreesboro, Tennessee
January 24, 2021; 1:00 p.m., CBSSN		at Middle Tennessee	W 68–52	13–4 (6–2)	23 – Bassey	14 – Bassey	3 – Anderson	Murphy Center; Murfreesboro, Tennessee
January 29, 2021; 7:00 p.m., CBSSN on Facebook		Old Dominion	Postponed					Diddle Arena; Bowling Green, KY
January 30, 2021; 4:00 p.m., CBSSN on Facebook		Old Dominion	Postponed					Diddle Arena; Bowling Green, KY
February 5, 2021; 6:00 p.m., ESPN+		at FAU	Postponed					FAU Arena; Boca Raton, FL
February 6, 2021; 3:00 p.m., ESPN+		at FAU	Postponed					FAU Arena; Boca Raton, FL
February 12, 2021; 7:00 p.m., ESPN+		Rice	W 77–71	14–4 (7–2)	18 – Bassey	12 – Bassey	9 – McKnight	Diddle Arena; Bowling Green, KY
February 13, 2021; 7:00 p.m., CBSSN		Rice	W 89–66	15–4 (8–2)	21 – Bassey	7 – Williams	9 – McKnight	Diddle Arena; Bowling Green, KY
February 20, 2021; 4:00 p.m., CBSSN on Facebook		at North Texas	Postponed (Note: Game was postponed due to weather concerns.)					UNT Coliseum; Denton, TX
February 21, 2021; 1:00 p.m., CBSSN on Facebook		at North Texas	Postponed					UNT Coliseum; Denton, TX
February 25, 2021*; 6:00 p.m., ESPN2		at No. 12 Houston	L 57–81	15–5	17 – Hollingsworth	7 – Bassey	4 – McKnight	Fertitta Center; Houston, TX
February 28, 2021; 2:00 p.m., ESPN+		FIU	W 91–58	16–5 (9–2)	21 – Williams	14 – Bassey	5 – Rawls	Diddle Arena; Bowling Green, KY
March 1, 2021; 12:00 p.m., ESPN+		FIU	W 71–59	17–5 (10–2)	22 – Bassey	15 – Bassey	6 – McKnight	Diddle Arena; Bowling Green, KY
March 5, 2021; 7:00 p.m.		Old Dominion	L 69–71	17–6 (10–3)	23 – Bassey	15 – Bassey	5 – Hollingsworth, McKnight	Diddle Arena (1,275); Bowling Green, KY
March 6, 2021; 4:00 p.m.		Old Dominion	W 60–57	18–6 (11–3)	19 – Hollingsworth	9 – Bassey	3 – Rawls	Diddle Arena (1,286); Bowling Green, KY
CUSA conference tournament
March 11, 2021; 5:30 p.m., Stadium	(E1)	vs. (W4) UTSA; Quarterfinals	W 80–67	19–6	21 – Bassey	9 – Bassey, Williams	4 – McKnight	Ford Center at The Star; Frisco, Texas
March 12, 2021; 12:00 p.m., CBSSN	(E1)	vs. (W2) UAB; Semifinals	W 64–60	20–6	22 – Bassey	7 – Bassey	9 – McKnight	Ford Center at The Star; Frisco, Texas
March 13, 2021; 9:00 p.m., CBSSN	(E1)	vs. (W3) North Texas; Championship	L 57–61 ^{OT}	20–7	14 – Anderson	11 – Bassey	3 – Hollingsworth	Ford Center at The Star; Frisco, Texas
NIT
March 17, 2021; 8:00 pm, ESPN2	(3)	vs. (2) Saint Mary's; First Round – Ole Miss bracket	W 69–67	21–7	21 – Hollingsworth	11 – Bassey	7 – Rawls	Comerica Center; Frisco, TX
March 25, 2021; 8:00 pm, ESPN2	(3)	vs. (4) Louisiana Tech; Quarterfinals	L 65–72	21–8	20 – Rawls	16 – Bassey	8 – Rawls	Comerica Center (737); Frisco, TX
*Non-conference game. ^{#}Rankings from AP Poll. (#) Tournament seedings in parentheses. All times are in Central Time.
