= 1949–50 Western Kentucky State Hilltoppers basketball team =

American college basketball season

1949–50 Western Kentucky State Hilltoppers basketball

Ohio Valley Conference Champion

NIT Tournament, Quarterfinals
- Conference: Ohio Valley Conference

Ranking
- AP: No. 8
- Record: 25–6 (8–0 OVC)
- Head coach: Edgar Diddle (28th season)
- Assistant coach: Ted Hornback
- Home arena: Health & Physical Education Building

The 1949–50 Western Kentucky State Hilltoppers men's basketball team represented Western Kentucky State College (now known as Western Kentucky University) during the 1949-50 NCAA University Division Basketball season. The Hilltoppers were led by future Naismith Memorial Basketball Hall of Fame coach Edgar Diddle and All-American center Bob Lavoy. The team then won the Ohio Valley Conference season championship and appeared in the 1950 National Invitation Tournament. During this period, the NIT was considered to be on par with the NCAA tournament. Lavoy and Johnny Givens were named to the All-Conference team, Lavoy was also selected to the OVC All-Tournament team.

== Schedule ==
| Date time, TV | Rank^{#} | Opponent^{#} | Result | Record | Site city, state |
Regular Season
| 12/3/1949 | | at Morehead State | W 58–47 | 1–0 (1-0) | Button Auditorium; Morehead, KY |
| 12/5/1949* | | Kentucky Wesleyan | W 89–45 | 2–0 | Health & Phys Ed Building; Bowling Green, KY |
| 12/8/1949* | | vs. Bowling Green State | W 78–57 | 3–0 | Jefferson County Armory; Louisville, KY |
| 12/10/1949* | | at Xavier | W 59–57 | 4–0 | Cincinnati Gardens; Cincinnati, OH |
| 12/13/1949* | | Georgetown (KY) | W 67–48 | 5–0 | Health & Phys Ed Building; Bowling Green, KY |
| 12/17/1949* | | at Cincinnati | L 54–55 | 5–1 | Cincinnati Gardens; Cincinnati, OH |
| 12/26/1949* | | at Canisius | W 74–61 | 6–1 | Buffalo, NY |
| 12/29/1948* | | vs. Long Island | L 66–73 | 6–2 | Madison Square Garden; New York, NY |
| 1/2/1950* | | at La Salle | L 69–80 | 6–3 | Wister Hall; Philadelphia, PA |
| 1/7/1950 | | Eastern Kentucky | W 86–61 | 7–3 (2-0) | Health & Phys Ed Building; Bowling Green, KY |
| 1/9/1950* | | Xavier | W 63–51 | 8–3 | Health & Phys Ed Building; Bowling Green, KY |
| 1/11/1950* | No. 14 | at Louisville | L 59–70 | 8–4 | Jefferson County Armory; Louisville, KY |
| 1/14/1950 | No. 14 | at Murray State | W 58–52 | 9–4 (3-0) | Carr Health Building; Murray, KY |
| 1/16/1950* | No. 14 | No. 12 Cincinnati | W 84–59 | 10–4 | Health & Phys Ed Building; Bowling Green, KY |
| 1/18/1950 | No. 17 | at Evansville | W 73–69 | 11–4 (4-0) | Evansville, IN |
| 1/21/1950 | No. 17 | at Eastern Kentucky | W 69–51 | 12–4 (5-0) | Weaver Gymnasium; Richmond, KY |
| 1/27/1950* | No. 17 | at Miami | W 66–61 | 13–4 | Miami, FL |
| 1/28/1950* | No. 17 | at Miami | W 78–61 | 14–4 | Miami, FL |
| 1/30/1950* | No. 17 | at Tampa | W 79–59 | 15–4 | Tampa, FL |
| 1/31/1950* | No. 14 | No. 15 Louisville | W 84–62 | 16–4 | Health & Phys Ed Building; Bowling Green, KY |
| 2/7/1950 | No. 11 | Morehead State | W 77–65 | 17–4 (6-0) | Health & Phys Ed Building; Bowling Green, KY |
| 2/9/1950* | No. 11 | vs. Bowling Green State | W 103–87 | 18–4 | Cleveland Arena; Cleveland, OH |
| 2/11/1950 | No. 11 | Murray State | W 54–50 | 19–4 (7-0) | Health & Phys Ed Building; Bowling Green, KY |
| 2/15/1950* | No. 9 | Miami | W 79–57 | 20–4 | Health & Phys Ed Building; Bowling Green, KY |
| 2/16/1950* | No. 9 | Miami | W 83–47 | 21–4 | Health & Phys Ed Building; Bowling Green, KY |
| 2/18/1950 | No. 9 | Evansville | W 81–56 | 22–4 (8-0) | Health & Phys Ed Building; Bowling Green, KY |
1950 Ohio Valley Conference Tournament
| 2/24/1950 | No. 9 | vs. Tennessee Tech; OVC Tournament | W 79–60 | 23–4 | Jefferson County Armory; Louisville, KY |
| 2/25/1950 | No. 9 | vs. Murray State; OVC Tournament Semifinal | W 58–54 | 24–4 | Jefferson County Armory; Louisville, KY |
| 2/26/1950 | No. 7 | vs. Eastern Kentucky; OVC Tournament Final | L 50–62 | 24–5 | Jefferson County Armory; Louisville, KY |
1950 National Invitation Tournament
| 3/11/1950* | No. 8 | vs. Niagara; NIT | W 79–72 | 25–5 | Madison Square Garden; New York, NY |
| 3/13/1950* | No. 8 | vs. No. 9 St. John's (NY); NIT Quarterfinal | L 60–69 | 25–6 | Madison Square Garden; New York, NY |
*Non-conference game. ^{#}Rankings from AP Poll. (#) Tournament seedings in parentheses.
