= 1961–62 Western Kentucky State Hilltoppers basketball team =

American college basketball season

1961–62 Western Kentucky State Hilltoppers basketball

Ohio Valley Conference Champion

NCAA Tournament, Sweet Sixteen
- Conference: Ohio Valley Conference
- Record: 17–10 (11–1 OVC)
- Head coach: Edgar Diddle (40th season)
- Assistant coach: Ted Hornback
- Home arena: Health & Physical Education Building

The 1961–62 Western Kentucky Hilltoppers men's basketball team represented Western Kentucky State College (now known as Western Kentucky University) during the 1961-62 NCAA University Division Basketball season. The Hilltoppers were led by Ohio Valley Conference Coach of the Year Edgar Diddle, in his 40th year as coach, and leading scorer Bobby Rascoe, who averaged more than 25 points per game. The Hilltoppers won the OVC championship, as well as the conference's automatic bid to the 1962 NCAA University Division basketball tournament, where they advanced to the Sweet Sixteen. Rascoe, Darel Carrier, and Harry Todd were named to the all-conference team. Diddle coached his 1000th game at Western on January 6, a victory against New Mexico State.

== Schedule ==
Date time, TV	Opponent	Result	Record	Site city, state
Regular Season
12/9/1961*	at Kent State	W 88–81	1–0	Memorial Athletic and Convocation Center; Kent, OH
12/12/1961*	Northwest Louisiana	W 93–66	2–0	Health & Physical Education Building; Bowling Green, KY
12/15/1961*	vs. No. 9 St. Bonaventure; Bluegrass Tournament	L 65–66	2–1	Freedom Hall; Louisville, KY
12/16/1961*	vs. Texas; Bluegrass Tournament	L 68–78	2–2	Freedom Hall; Louisville, KY
12/19/1961*	Southeastern Louisiana	W 86–62	3–2	Health & Physical Education Building; Bowling Green, KY
12/29/1961*	at Marshall	L 84–89	3–3	Memorial Field House; Huntington, WV
12/30/1961*	at Xavier	L 83–95	3–4	Schmidt Fieldhouse; Cincinnati, OH
1/6/1962*	New Mexico State; Diddle’s 1000th Game	W 71–67	4–4	Health & Physical Education Building; Bowling Green, KY
1/9/1962	Tennessee Tech	W 93–61	5–4 (1-0)	Health & Physical Education Building; Bowling Green, KY
1/13/1962	at Murray State	W 72–61	6–4 (2-0)	Racer Arena; Murray, KY
1/18/1962	at Morehead State	W 80–79	7–4 (3-0)	Wetherby Gymnasium; Morehead, KY
1/20/1962	Middle Tennessee	W 89–69	8–4 (4-0)	Health & Physical Education Building; Bowling Green, KY
1/27/1962	at Eastern Kentucky	W 96–62	9–4 (5-0)	Alumni Coliseum; Richmond, KY
1/30/1962	at Tennessee Tech	L 72–79	9–5 (5-1)	Memorial Gymnasium; Cookeville, TN
2/3/1962*	at DePaul	L 78–86	9–6	Alumni Hall; Chicago, IL
2/6/1962	at East Tennessee	W 89–84	10–6 (6-1)	Brooks Gymnasium; Johnson City, TN
2/13/1962	at Middle Tennessee	W 87–81	11–6 (7-1)	Alumni Memorial Gym; Murfreesboro, TN
2/17/1962	Murray State	W 96–77	12–6 (8-1)	Health & Physical Education Building; Bowling Green, KY
2/19/1962	Morehead State	W 77–51	13–6 (9-1)	Health & Physical Education Building; Bowling Green, KY
2/21/1962*	Xavier	W 88–83	14–6	Health & Physical Education Building; Bowling Green, KY
2/24/1962	Eastern Kentucky	W 88–74	15–6 (10-1)	Health & Physical Education Building; Bowling Green, KY
2/26/1962	East Tennessee	W 77–66	16–6 (11-1)	Health & Physical Education Building; Bowling Green, KY
3/2/1962*	at La Salle	L 84–88	16–7	Convention Hall; Philadelphia, PA
3/7/1962*	at Louisville	L 71–88	16–8	Freedom Hall; Louisville, KY
1962 NCAA University Division basketball tournament
3/12/1962*	vs. Detroit; Mideast Region First Round	W 90–81	17–8	Memorial Coliseum; Lexington, KY
3/16/1962*	vs. No. 1 Ohio State; Sweet Sixteen	L 73–93	17–9	Iowa Field House; Iowa City, IA
3/17/1962*	vs. Butler; Mideast Region Consolation	L 86–87	17–10	Iowa Field House; Iowa City, IA
*Non-conference game. ^{#}Rankings from AP Poll. (#) Tournament seedings in parentheses.
