= 1950–51 Western Kentucky State Hilltoppers basketball team =

American college basketball season

1950–51 Western Kentucky State Hilltoppers basketball

NCBT Tournament, First Round
- Conference: Ohio Valley Conference
- Record: 19–10 (4–4 OVC)
- Head coach: Edgar Diddle (29th season)
- Assistant coach: Ted Hornback
- Home arena: Health & Physical Education Building

The 1950–51 Western Kentucky State Hilltoppers men's basketball team represented Western Kentucky State College (now known as Western Kentucky University) during the 1950-51 NCAA University Division Basketball season. The Hilltoppers were led by future Naismith Memorial Basketball Hall of Fame coach Edgar Diddle and All-Ohio Valley Conference player Rip Gish. Gish also made the OVC Tournament team. The team participated in the only National Campus Basketball Tournament. This was a new tournament hosted by Bradley University in response to the ongoing point shaving scandal. It was thought that hosting a tournament on a campus site would reduce the opportunity for such scandals.

== Schedule ==
Date time, TV	Opponent	Result	Record	Site city, state
Regular Season
11/30/1950*	Southeastern Louisiana	W 73–59	1–0	Health & Phys Ed Building; Bowling Green, KY
12/5/1950*	Georgetown (KY)	W 93–44	2–0	Health & Phys Ed Building; Bowling Green, KY
12/9/1950*	at Cincinnati	L 45–70	2–1	Cincinnati Gardens; Cincinnati, OH
12/12/1950*	West Texas State	W 74–46	3–1	Health & Phys Ed Building; Bowling Green, KY
12/14/1950*	Tampa	W 103–70	4–1	Health & Phys Ed Building; Bowling Green, KY
12/16/1950*	High Point	W 77–64	5–1	Health & Phys Ed Building; Bowling Green, KY
12/18/1950	at Morehead State	L 63–70	5–2 (0-1)	Button Auditorium; Morehead, KY
12/26/1950*	at No. 16 La Salle	W 73–63	6–2	Wister Hall; Philadelphia, PA
12/28/1950*	vs. No. 4 Long Island	L 70–77	6–3	Madison Square Garden; New York, NY
12/30/1950*	vs. St. Bonaventure	L 57–62	6–4	Memorial Auditorium; Buffalo, NY
1/8/1951*	Xavier	W 79–62	7–4	Health & Phys Ed Building; Bowling Green, KY
1/10/1951	vs. Evansville	W 75–63	8–4 (1-1)	Owensboro Sportscenter; Owensboro, KY
1/13/1951	Murray State	W 65–56	9–4 (2-1)	Health & Phys Ed Building; Bowling Green, KY
1/16/1951*	Miami	W 89–47	10–4	Health & Phys Ed Building; Bowling Green, KY
1/18/1951	at Evansville	L 46–77	10–5 (2-2)	Evansville, IN
1/20/1951*	vs. Bowling Green State	W 69–68	11–5	Owensboro Sportscenter; Owensboro, KY
1/26/1951*	at Miami	W 68–64	12–5	Miami, FL
1/27/1951*	at Tampa	W 67–64	13–5	Tampa, FL
2/3/1951	at Eastern Kentucky	L 70–84	13–6 (2-3)	Weaver Gymnasium; Richmond, KY
2/8/1951*	No. 11 Cincinnati	W 75–70	14–6	Health & Phys Ed Building; Bowling Green, KY
2/10/1951	at Murray State	L 70–77	14–7 (2-4)	Carr Health Building; Murray, KY
2/14/1951*	Kentucky Wesleyan	W 86–62	15–7	Health & Phys Ed Building; Bowling Green, KY
2/17/1951	Eastern Kentucky	W 84–80	16–7 (3-4)	Health & Phys Ed Building; Bowling Green, KY
2/19/1951	Morehead State	W 95–73	17–7 (4-4)	Health & Phys Ed Building; Bowling Green, KY
1951 Ohio Valley Conference Tournament
2/24/1951	vs. No. 16 Murray State; OVC Tournament Semifinal	L 77–78	17–8	Jefferson County Armory; Louisville, KY
2/24/1951	vs. Evansville; OVC Tournament Consolation	W 72–71	18–8	Jefferson County Armory; Louisville, KY
Regular Season
2/28/1951*	at Xavier	L 64–67	18–9	Schmidt Fieldhouse; Cincinnati, OH
3/15/1951*	vs. Bowling Green State	W 78–77	19–9	Toledo, OH
1951 National Campus Basketball Tournament
3/27/1951*	at No. 6 Bradley; NCBT Quarterfinal	L 71–75	19–10	Robertson Memorial Field House; Peoria, IL
*Non-conference game. ^{#}Rankings from AP Poll. (#) Tournament seedings in parentheses.
