= 2002–03 Western Kentucky Hilltoppers basketball team =

American college basketball season

2002–03 Western Kentucky Hilltoppers basketball

SBC Tournament Champion SBC East Division Champion

NCAA Tournament, first round
- Conference: Sun Belt Conference
- East Division
- Record: 24–9 (12–2 Sun Belt)
- Head coach: Dennis Felton
- Assistant coach: Pete Herrmann
- Home arena: E. A. Diddle Arena

2002–03 Sun Belt Conference men's basketball standings
	Conf.				Overall
Team	W		L	PCT	W		L	PCT
East
Western Kentucky †	12	–	2	.857	24	–	9	.727
Middle Tennessee	9	–	5	.643	16	–	14	.533
Arkansas-Little Rock	8	–	6	.571	18	–	12	.600
Arkansas State	6	–	8	.429	13	–	15	.464
Florida International	1	–	13	.071	8	–	21	.276
West
Louisiana–Lafayette	12	–	3	.800	20	–	10	.667
New Mexico State	9	–	6	.600	20	–	9	.690
South Alabama	7	–	8	.467	14	–	14	.500
New Orleans	7	–	8	.467	15	–	14	.517
Denver	7	–	8	.467	17	–	15	.531
North Texas	2	–	13	.133	7	–	21	.250
† 2003 Sun Belt Conference tournament winner Rankings from AP poll

The 2002–03 Western Kentucky Hilltoppers men's basketball team represented Western Kentucky University during the 2002–03 NCAA Division I men's basketball season. The Hilltoppers were led by head coach Dennis Felton and All Sun Belt Conference forward, David Boyden. They finished 1st in the SBC East Division and won the conference tournament and automatic bid to the 2003 NCAA Division I men's basketball tournament. Joining Boyden on the All SBC team was Mike Wells and Patrick Sparks, as well as SBC Freshman of the Year, Anthony Winchester. Boyden and Wells also made the SBC All-Tournament team and Sparks was tournament MVP.

== Schedule ==
Date time, TV	Rank^{#}	Opponent^{#}	Result	Record	Site city, state
Regular season
11/23/2002*	No. 19	at No. 1 Arizona	L 68–107	0–1	McKale Center (14,584); Tucson, AZ
11/26/2002*		VCU	W 80–73 ^{OT}	1–1	E. A. Diddle Arena (5,131); Bowling Green, KY
12/1/2002*		vs. Auburn	W 89–70	2–1	Gaylord Entertainment Center (6,589); Nashville, TN
12/3/2002*		at Evansville	L 76–81 ^{OT}	2–2	Roberts Municipal Stadium (6,900); Evansville, IN
12/7/2002*		at Murray State	L 72–83	2–3	CFSB Center (7,288); Murray, KY
12/15/2002*		Illinois State	W 63–43	3–3	E. A. Diddle Arena (5,130); Bowling Green, KY
12/18/2002*		Southern Mississippi	W 64–54	4–3	E. A. Diddle Arena (4,270); Bowling Green, KY
12/20/2002*		Saint Francis (PA)	W 80–45	5–3	E. A. Diddle Arena (3,641); Bowling Green, KY
12/23/2002*		at Pacific	L 57–70	5–4	Alex G. Spanos Center (2,701); Stockton, CA
12/28/2002*		vs. Chicago State; Rainbow Classic	W 63–56	6–4	Stan Sheriff Center (6,097); Honolulu, HI
12/29/2002*		vs. Butler; Rainbow Classic	L 60–63	6–5	Stan Sheriff Center (7,184); Honolulu, HI
12/30/2002*		vs. Tennessee Tech; Rainbow Classic	W 74–51	7–5	Stan Sheriff Center (7,925); Honolulu, HI
1/4/2003		at Middle Tennessee	L 65–69	7–6 (0–1)	Murphy Center (3,804); Murfreesboro, TN
1/9/2003		at Arkansas–Little Rock	W 74–66	8–6 (1–1)	Alltel Arena (4,358); North Little Rock, AR
1/11/2003		at Arkansas State	W 77–69	9–6 (2–1)	Convocation Center (5,262); Jonesboro, AR
1/16/2003		New Orleans	W 78–59	10–6 (3–1)	E. A. Diddle Arena (3,752); Bowling Green, KY
1/18/2003		South Alabama	W 85–69	11–6 (4–1)	E. A. Diddle Arena (6,418); Bowling Green, KY
1/25/2003		at New Mexico State	L 82–92	11–7 (4–2)	Pan American Center (9,113); Las Cruces, NM
1/30/2003		FIU	W 63–43	12–7 (5–2)	E. A. Diddle Arena (5,112); Bowling Green, KY
2/1/2003*		at Detroit	L 65–86	12–8	Calihan Hall (3,362); Detroit, MI
2/3/2003*		Kentucky State	W 104–70	13–8	E. A. Diddle Arena (3,743); Bowling Green, KY
02/5/2003		Denver	W 81–77	14–8 (6–2)	E. A. Diddle Arena (4,707); Bowling Green, KY
2/8/2003		at North Texas	W 85–70	15–8 (7–2)	UNT Coliseum (4,212); Denton, TX
2/13/2003		Arkansas–Little Rock	W 70–51	16–8 (8–2)	E. A. Diddle Arena (4,108); Bowling Green, KY
2/15/2003		Arkansas State	W 69–63	17–8 (9–2)	E. A. Diddle Arena (5,312); Bowling Green, KY
2/19/2003		at FIU	W 71–58	18–8 (10–2)	Ocean Bank Convocation Center (689); University Park, FL
2/22/2003*		Ball State; ESPN BracketBusters	W 84–79	19–8	E. A. Diddle Arena (6,112); Bowling Green, KY
2/26/2003		at Louisiana–Lafayette	W 69–66	20–8 (11–2)	Cajundome (9,121); Lafayette, LA
3/1/2003		Middle Tennessee	W 85–83 ^{OT}	21–8 (12–2)	E. A. Diddle Arena (7,412); Bowling Green, KY
Sun Belt tournament
3/8/2003	(E1)	(E5) FIU; Second Round	W 71–60	22–8	E. A. Diddle Arena (7,259); Bowling Green, KY
3/10/2003	(E1)	(W2) New Mexico State; Semifinals	W 78–59	23–8	E. A. Diddle Arena (7,337); Bowling Green, KY
3/11/2003	(E1)	(E2) Middle Tennessee; Finals	W 64–52	24–8	E. A. Diddle Arena (8,118); Bowling Green, KY
NCAA tournament
03/20/2003*	(13 W)	vs. (4 W) No. 11 Illinois; First Round	L 60–65	24–9	RCA Dome (21,250); Indianapolis, IN
*Non-conference game. ^{#}Rankings from AP Poll (W#) during NCAA Tournament is seed with Region. (#) Tournament seedings in parentheses.
