= Johnny Britt =

American basketball player

Personal information
- Listed height: 6 ft 2 in (1.88 m)

Career information
- High school: Warren East (Bowling Green, Kentucky)
- College: Western Kentucky (1972–1976)
- NBA draft: 1976: 7th round, 120th overall pick
- Drafted by: Cleveland Cavaliers
- Position: Guard

Career highlights
- OVC co-Player of the Year (1976); 3× All-OVC (1974–1976); OVC tournament MVP (1976)
- Stats at Basketball Reference

Johnny Britt is an American former basketball player. He played college basketball for the Western Kentucky Hilltoppers and was selected as the Ohio Valley Conference (OVC) co-Player of the Year in 1976.

== Basketball career ==
Britt is from Oakland, Kentucky. He attended Warren East High School where he played on the basketball team for three seasons. Britt played alongside his brother Jerry, cousin James, and nephew Marcus. Despite his 6 ft 2 in (1.88 m) height, he played as a center, forward and guard. Britt averaged 32.4 points, 19.5 rebounds and 8 assists per game during the 1970–71 season. He led his team to a 29–2 record during the 1971–72 season while he averaged 29.5 points, 20 rebounds and 9 assists per game.

Britt signed a scholarship to play basketball for the Western Kentucky Hilltoppers in 1972. He was their starting guard for the four seasons he played and was named to the All-Ohio Valley Conference (OVC) team three times. Britt was chosen as the OVC Player of the Year in 1976 alongside Tim Sisneros of the Middle Tennessee Blue Raiders.

Britt was selected by the Cleveland Cavaliers in the seventh round of the 1976 NBA draft. He had not received any contact from the Cavaliers prior to them drafting him. Britt was released by the Cavaliers after a three-day stint in preseason.

Britt was inducted in the Western Kentucky Athletics Hall of Fame in 1999. His jersey number 42 was retired by Warren East High School in 2010.

== Personal life ==
Britt's daughter, Joni, played basketball at Lindsey Wilson University.
