= Ralph Crosthwaite =

American basketball player (1935–1999)

Personal information
- Born: November 13, 1935 Cincinnati, Ohio, U.S.
- Died: October 28, 1999 (aged 63)
- Listed height: 6 ft 9 in (2.06 m)
- Listed weight: 240 lb (109 kg)

Career information
- High school: Western Hills (Cincinnati, Ohio)
- College: Western Kentucky (1954–1959)
- NBA draft: 1959: 3rd round, 22nd overall pick
- Drafted by: Boston Celtics
- Position: Center

Career highlights
- 4× First-team All-OVC (1955, 1957–1959)
- Stats at Basketball Reference

Ralph E. Crosthwaite (November 13, 1935 – October 28, 1999) was an American basketball player who is best known for his collegiate career at Western Kentucky University (WKU) between 1954–55 and 1958–59. Within the WKU community, he is considered to be one of the greatest players in program history.

== Collegiate basketball career ==
=== Freshman ===
Crosthwaite enrolled at WKU in the fall of 1954. At this time in NCAA athletics, freshmen were allowed to play varsity sports (not long thereafter, a rule was instituted where college freshmen had to wait until their sophomore season to play varsity sports). The 6 ft 9 in (2.06 m), 240 pound (109 kg) center made an immediate impact in his first season, averaging 16.8 points and 10.8 rebounds per game. The Hilltoppers compiled an 18–10 (8–2 Ohio Valley Conference) record en route to the regular season conference championship. He was named to the All-OVC Team, which at the time did not distinguish between First Team or Second Team selections. The following year, in what would have been Crosthwaite's true sophomore season, he did not play for personal reasons.

=== Sophomore ===
When Crosthwaite returned as a redshirt sophomore in 1956–57, he led WKU to a co-conference regular season championship. He averaged 20.3 points and 11.9 rebounds per game and was named First Team All-OVC. Former WKU star and then-Tennessee Tech head coach John Oldham, who had to coach against Crosthwaite, said of him:

Ralph was one of the best big men ever at Western, definitely among the top three centers ever to play here. He was physically strong and very tough around the basket. He controlled everything on the court from 10-feet on in. He had a way of leaning into the defender to clear out room while driving towards the basket that was frustrating to try and stop.

=== Junior ===
Crosthwaite's personally greatest season came when he was a junior in 1957–58. That year he averaged career highs of 22.8 points and 15.3 rebounds even though the team only compiled a 14–11 (5–5 OVC) record. He shot an NCAA-leading 61.0% from the field, and his rebounding average is still the highest single season average in WKU history. He was named to the All-OVC Team for the third time in his career and was drafted by the National Basketball Association's Detroit Pistons in the fourth round (27th overall).

=== Senior ===
Despite being drafted to the NBA he returned for his senior season in 1958–59. Heading into the season, all eyes were on Crosthwaite. A reporter wrote an article during the preseason that said:

This rugged giant is devastating around the basket with his operations. He can fake and drive for a dunk shot; he can come down the lane like a steamroller; he can hook from either side; or he can drop in a soft overhead push shot from the head of the circle. Once the ball is on the boards, Crosthwaite is always dangerous with his ability to follow for bat-ins. He has no peer as a rebounder. With Crosthwaite ready to go, Western Kentucky will not be a "soft touch" for any of the 26 opponents on the 1958–59 schedule.

He managed to average 20.8 points and 12.8 rebounds per game, and once again Crosthwaite led the nation field goal shooting percentage at 64.5%. He was selected to his fourth All-Conference team, but Western Kentucky finished 16–10 (8–4 OVC) and failed to qualify for a national postseason tournament. At the conclusion of Crosthwaite's career in 1959, he was WKU's all-time leading scorer with 2,076 points (since passed by Jim McDaniels and Courtney Lee) and is still the third all-time leading rebounder with 1,309. His career 20.1 points per game average is fifth in school history, while his career 12.7 rebounds per game average places him second. By scoring 2,000+ points and grabbing 1,000+ rebounds, Crosthwaite also joined an exclusive list of NCAA Division I men's basketball players to reach both milestones.

In the 1959 NBA draft, the Boston Celtics selected him as the 24th overall pick, but for personal reasons Crosthwaite never played in the NBA. In 1995, Western Kentucky University enshrined him their athletics hall of fame.

== See also ==
- List of NCAA Division I men's basketball players with 2,000 points and 1,000 rebounds
