= Jim Richards (basketball) =

American basketball coach (1936–2026)

Jim Richards (1936 – October 9, 2026) was an American basketball coach. He was the head coach of men's basketball at Western Kentucky University, coaching the team for seven seasons from 1971 to 1978. Richards was inducted into the Western Kentucky University Athletic Hall of Fame in 2005.

== Life and career ==
Richards was born in rural Adair County, Kentucky in 1936. He played basketball for one year at Adair County High School. He was recruited to play baseball at Western by Coach E. A. Diddle (better known as the basketball coach). Diddle got Richards into officiating high school basketball. After graduation, Richards was hired as head basketball coach at Auburn High School. He went from there to Glasgow High, where he coached the Scotties to a state championship in 1968.

He returned to Western as an assistant the following year, when an opening occurred on John Oldham's staff after Gene Rhodes left to coach the Kentucky Colonels of the American Basketball Association. When Oldham left the sidelines to become athletic director, Richards became head coach for the 1971–1972 season.

His overall record at Western was 102–84. His Hilltopper teams won two regular season Ohio Valley Conference championships, plus two tournament championships. The Toppers made the NCAA men's basketball tournament twice, with an overall record of one win and two losses.

After stepping down as head basketball coach, Richards coached the men's golf team. One of his recruits was Kenny Perry from nearby Franklin, Kentucky. Perry went on to play on the PGA Tour.

Richards died on October 9, 2026, at the age of 90.
