= Western Kentucky Hilltoppers basketball =

Men's basketball team

Western Kentucky Hilltoppers
2026–27 Western Kentucky Hilltoppers basketball team
- University: Western Kentucky University
- First season: 1914; 112 years ago
- Head coach: Hank Plona (3rd season)
- Location: Bowling Green, Kentucky
- Arena: E. A. Diddle Arena (capacity: 7326)
- Conference: Conference USA
- Nickname: Hilltoppers
- Colors: Red and white

NCAA Division I tournament Final Four
- 1971
Other NCAA Division I tournament results
Elite Eight	1940, 1971
Sweet Sixteen	1940, 1960, 1962, 1966, 1971, 1978, 1993, 2008
Appearances	1940, 1960, 1962, 1966, 1967, 1970, 1971, 1976, 1978, 1980, 1981, 1986, 1987, 1993, 1994, 1995, 2001, 2002, 2003, 2008, 2009, 2012, 2013, 2024

Conference tournament champions
- 1932, 1933, 1934, 1935, 1936, 1937, 1938, 1939, 1940, 1941, 1942, 1943, 1947, 1948, 1949, 1952, 1953, 1954, 1965, 1966, 1976, 1978, 1980, 1981, 1993, 1995, 2001, 2002, 2003, 2008, 2009, 2012, 2013, 2024

Conference regular-season champions
- 1949, 1950, 1952, 1954, 1955, 1956, 1957, 1960, 1961, 1962, 1966, 1967, 1970, 1971, 1972, 1976, 1980, 1981, 1982, 1987, 1994, 1995, 2001, 2002, 2003, 2006, 2008, 2009, 2021

Conference division champions
- Sun Belt East: 2001, 2002, 2003, 2006, 2008, 2009, C-USA East: 2021

Uniforms
Home	Away
- * - vacated by NCAA

The Western Kentucky Hilltoppers men's basketball team is the men's basketball team that represents Western Kentucky University (WKU) in Bowling Green, Kentucky. The Hilltoppers currently compete in Conference USA. The team's most recent appearance in the NCAA Division I men's basketball tournament was in 2024. Hank Plona was announced as the team's current head coach on April 2, 2024.

The men's basketball program has the 16th most victories in the history of the NCAA and has attained the eighth best winning percentage in NCAA history. The school made an NCAA Final Four appearance in 1971, which was later vacated, and has made four NIT Final Four appearances, including three in the early days of the NIT when it was on par with the NCAA tournament. The program has won numerous Ohio Valley Conference championships and was very competitive in its previous conference, the Sun Belt Conference, regularly finishing near the top of the conference and competing for the conference championship. In 2014, the Hilltoppers joined Conference USA following conference realignment.

Street & Smith's publication "100 Greatest Programs", ranked WKU #31. WKU has had 30 All Americans and 56 Hilltoppers have played professionally following their collegiate careers.

== Conference affiliation history ==
- 1914–15 to 1925–26 – Independent
- 1926–27 to 1947–48 – Kentucky Intercollegiate Athletic Association & Southern Intercollegiate Athletic Association
- 1948–49 to 1981–82 – Ohio Valley Conference
- 1982–83 to 2013–14 – Sun Belt Conference
- 2014–15 to present – Conference USA

== Postseason ==
WKU has appeared in 41 national postseason tournaments and in five national final fours. The school currently has a policy of only accepting invitations to the NCAA or NIT tournaments, which precludes participation in other tournaments such as the CollegeInsider.com Postseason Tournament and College Basketball Invitational.

=== NCAA tournament results ===
The Hilltoppers have appeared in the NCAA tournament 24 times. Their combined record is 19–25. Their appearance in the 1971 NCAA Tournament and third-place finish were later vacated by the NCAA due to a player, Jim McDaniels, having signed a professional contract and accepted money during the season.

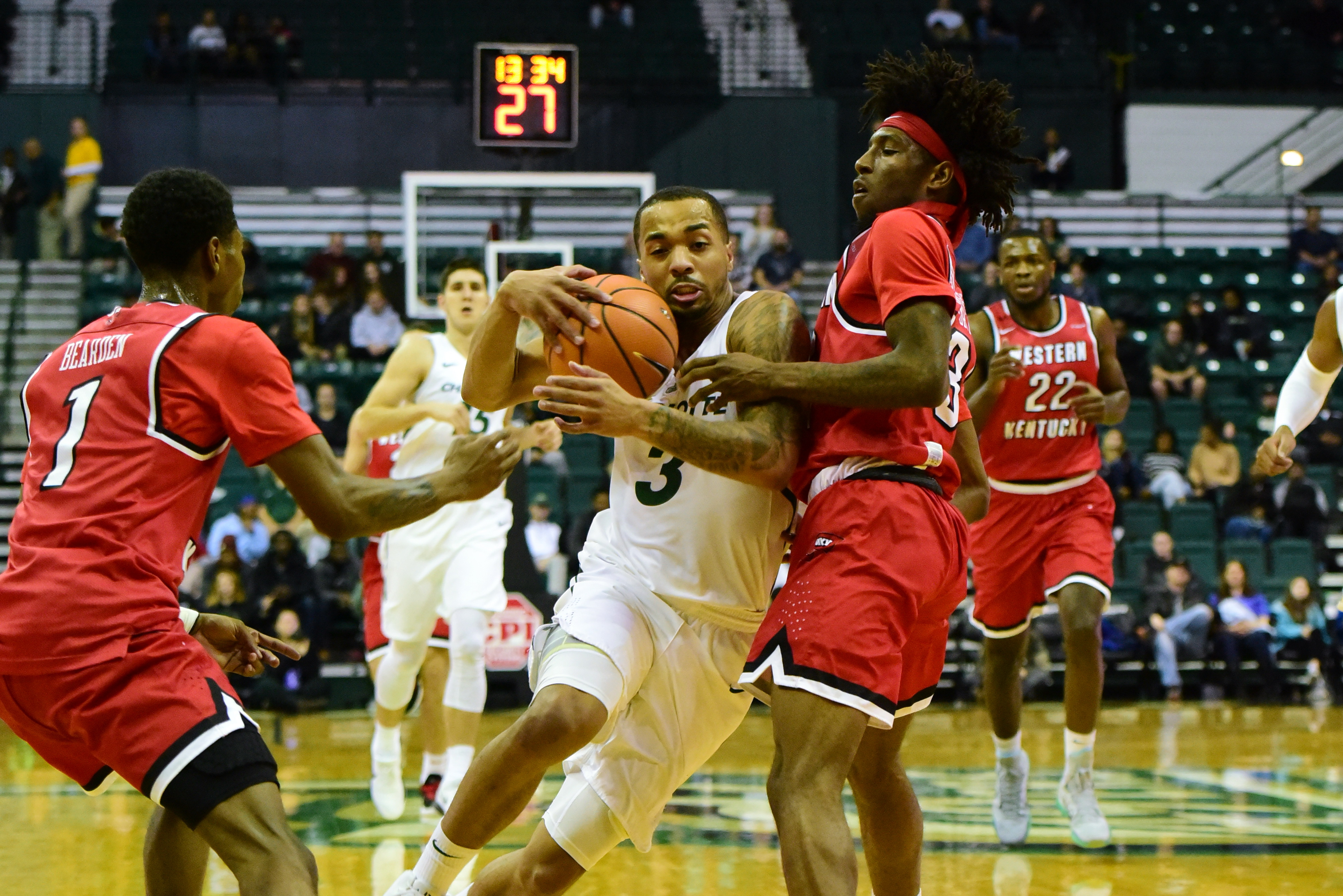
WK game in 2018

Year	Seed	Round	Opponent	Result
1940		Elite Eight	Duquesne	L 29–30
1960		First Round; Sweet Sixteen; Regional 3rd Place Game	Miami (FL); Ohio State; Ohio	W 107–84; L 79–98; W 97–87
1962		First Round; Sweet Sixteen; Regional 3rd Place Game	Detroit; Ohio State; Butler	W 90–81; L 73–93; L 86–87
1966		First Round; Sweet Sixteen; Regional 3rd Place Game	Loyola (IL); Michigan; Dayton	W 105–86; L 79–80; W 82–62
1967		First Round	Dayton	L 67–69 ^{OT}
1970		First Round	Jacksonville	L 96–109
1971*		First Round; Sweet Sixteen; Elite Eight; Final Four; National 3rd Place Game	Jacksonville; Kentucky; Ohio State; Villanova; Kansas	W 74–72; W 107–83; W 81–78 ^{OT} L 89–92 ^{2OT} W 77–75
1976		First Round	Marquette	L 60–79
1978		First Round; Sweet Sixteen	Syracuse; Michigan State	W 87–86 ^{OT} L 69–90
1980	No. 10	First Round	No. 7 Virginia Tech	L 85–89 ^{OT}
1981	No. 10	First Round	No. 7 UAB	L 68–93
1986	No. 8	First Round; Second Round	No. 9 Nebraska; No. 1 Kentucky	W 67–59; L 64–71
1987	No. 10	First Round; Second Round	No. 7 West Virginia; No. 2 Syracuse	W 64–62; L 86–104
1993	No. 7	First Round; Second Round; Sweet Sixteen	No. 10 Memphis; No. 2 Seton Hall; No. 3 Florida State	W 55–52; W 72–68; L 78–81 ^{OT}
1994	No. 11	First Round	No. 6 Texas	L 77–91
1995	No. 8	First Round; Second Round	No. 9 Michigan; No. 1 Kansas	W 82–76 ^{OT} L 70–75
2001	No. 14	First Round	No. 3 Florida	L 56–69
2002	No. 9	First Round	No. 8 Stanford	L 68–84
2003	No. 13	First Round	No. 4 Illinois	L 60–65
2008	No. 12	First Round; Second Round; Sweet Sixteen	No. 5 Drake; No. 13 San Diego; No. 1 UCLA	W 101–99 ^{OT} W 72–63; L 78–88
2009	No. 12	First Round; Second Round	No. 5 Illinois; No. 4 Gonzaga	W 76–72; L 81–83
2012	No. 16	First Four; First Round	No. 16 Mississippi Valley State; No. 1 Kentucky	W 59–58; L 66–81
2013	No. 16	First Round	No. 1 Kansas	L 57–64
2024	No. 15	First Round	No. 2 Marquette	L 69–87

* Vacated by the NCAA

=== NCAA Tournament seeding history ===
The NCAA began seeding the tournament with the 1979 edition.

Years→	'80	'81	'86	'87	'93	'94	'95	'01	'02	'03	'08	'09	'12	'13	'24
Seeds→	10	10	8	10	7	11	8	14	9	13	12	12	16	16	15

=== NIT results ===
The Hilltoppers have appeared in the National Invitation Tournament (NIT) 15 times. When the NIT started, it was considered the premiere national college basketball tournament and remained on par with the NCAA Tournament through the mid-1950s, until the NCAA began giving automatic bids to conference champions in 1956. Western Kentucky's first eight appearances occurred during this early period, including their 2nd-place finish in 1942, 3rd place in 1948, and 4th place in 1954. WKU also made the NIT Final Four in 2018. Their combined record is 13–16.

Year	Round	Opponent	Result
1942	Quarterfinals; Semifinals; Finals	CCNY; Creighton; West Virginia	W 49–46; W 49–36; L 45–47
1943	Quarterfinals	Fordham	L 58–60
1948	Quarterfinals; Semifinals; 3rd Place Game	La Salle; Saint Louis; DePaul	W 68–61; L 53–60; W 61–59
1949	Quarterfinals	Bradley	L 86–95
1950	First Round; Quarterfinals	Niagara; St. John's	W 79–72; L 46–65
1952	First Round; Quarterfinals	Louisville; St. Bonaventure	W 62–59; L 69–70
1953	Quarterfinals	Duquesne	L 61–69
1954	Quarterfinals; Semifinals; 3rd Place Game	Bowling Green; Holy Cross; Niagara	W 95–81; L 69–75; L 65–71
1965	First Round; Quarterfinals	Fordham; Army	W 57–53; L 54–58
1982	First Round	Purdue	L 65–72
1992	First Round	Kansas State	L 74–85
2005	Opening Round; First Round	Kent State; Wichita State	W 88–80; L 81–84
2006	First Round	South Carolina	L 55–74
2018	First Round; Second Round; Quarterfinals; Semifinals	Boston College; USC; Oklahoma State; Utah	W 79–62; W 79–75; W 92–84; L 64–69
2021	First Round; Quarterfinals	Saint Mary's; Louisiana Tech	W 69–67; L 65–72

=== Other tournament results ===
In 1936 Western Kentucky was invited to the National Olympic Playoffs representing the South. They played two games against the Southwest representative, Arkansas, in Little Rock, losing both games by scores of 36–43 and 30–38.

The Hilltoppers were scheduled to appear in the 1938 National Intercollegiate Basketball tournament; however, the team was unable to make the trip and withdrew from the tournament. The NAIA lists the game as a forfeit, but Western Kentucky does not recognize the contest as part of their official record.

The Hilltoppers appeared in the 1951 National Campus Basketball Tournament where they were defeated by Bradley 71–75 in the first round.

== Milestones ==
Date	Milestone	Rival	Result
1914–1915	First win	Bethel (Ky.)	38–21 (W)
1/28/1932	100th win	Birmingham Southern	37–25 (W)
12/5/1949	500th win	Kentucky Wesleyan	89–45 (W)
2/19/1977	1,000th win	Murray State	82–81 (W)
2/5/2005	1,500th win	Arkansas State	76–72 (W)
2/6/1943	500th game	LaSalle	52–44 (W)
12/6/1960	1,000th game	Lamar	74–71 (W)
1/25/1997	2,000th game	New Orleans	70–66 (L)

== E.A. Diddle Arena ==
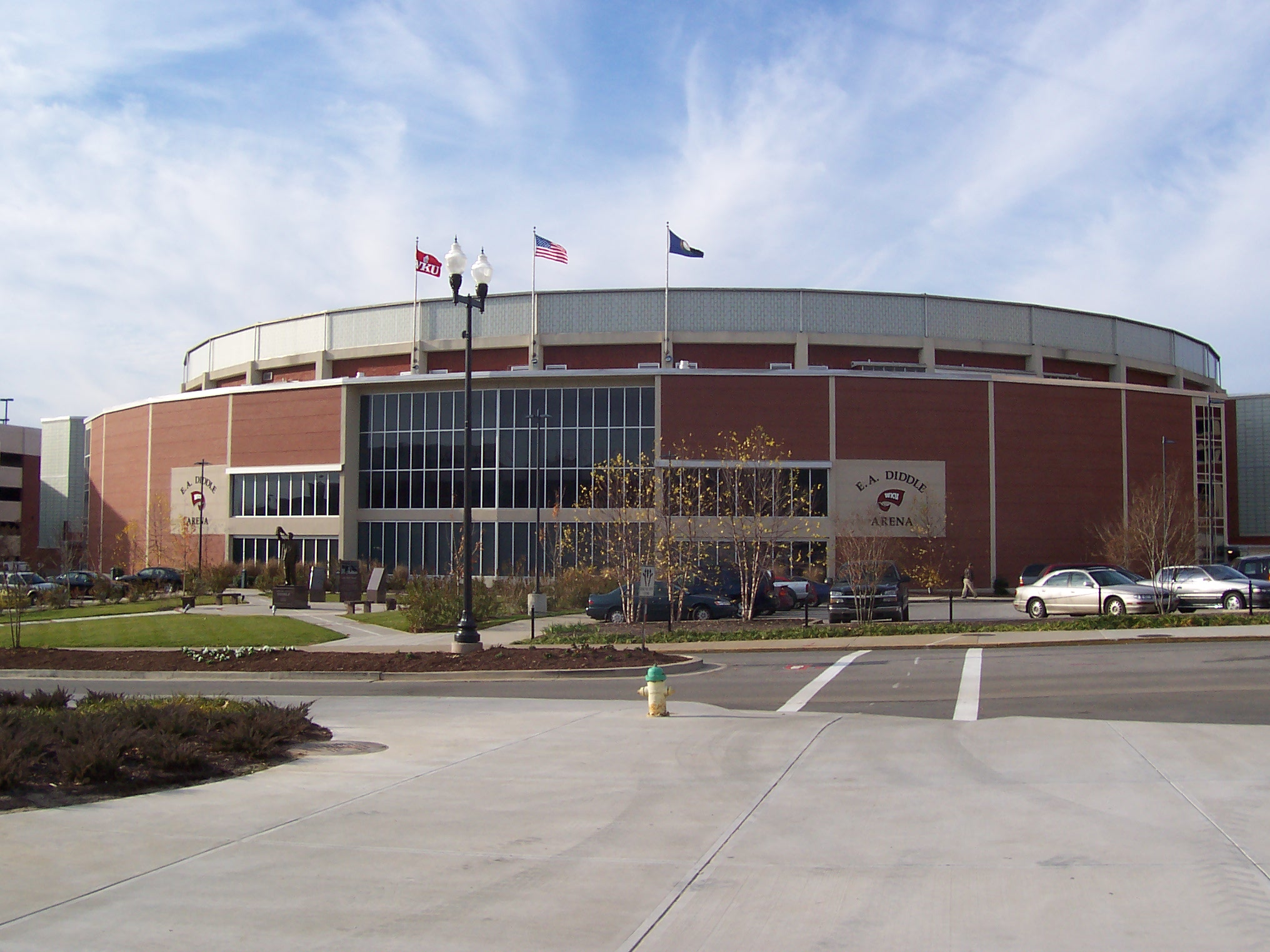
E.A. Diddle Arena

The E.A. Diddle Arena is a 7,326-seat multi-purpose arena in Bowling Green, Kentucky, United States. The arena, built in 1963 is named after legendary WKU men's coach and Basketball Hall of Famer Edgar "E.A." Diddle.

== Current coaching staff ==
- Hank Plona - Head Coach

== Former Head Coaches ==
- L.T Smith (1922–1922)
- E. A. Diddle (1923–1964)
- John Oldham (1965–1971)
- Jim Richards (1972–1978)
- Gene Keady (1979–1980)
- Clem Haskins (1981–1986)
- Murray Arnold (1987–1990)
- Ralph Willard (1991–1994)
- Matt Kilcullen (1995–1998)
- Al Seibert (1998)
- Dennis Felton (1999–2003)
- Darrin Horn (2004–2008)
- Ken McDonald (basketball) (2009–2012)
- Ray Harper (2012–2016)
- Rick Stansbury (2017–2023)
- Steve Lutz (2023–2024)

== All-Americans ==
Year	Name	Position	Ref.
1938	Red McCrocklin	Center	(Chuck Taylor)
1940	Carlisle Towery	Center	(Chuck Taylor)
1941	Carlisle Towery	Center	(Chuck Taylor)
1943	Oran McKinney	Center	(Helms Foundation)
1948	Dee Gibson	Guard	(Associated Press***)
1948	Don Ray	Forward	(Helms Foundation*)
1948	Odie Spears	Forward	(Associated Press***)
1949	Bob Lavoy	Center	(Associated Press***)
1949	John Oldham	Guard	(United Press**, Associated Press***)
1950	Buddy Cate	Forward	(Associated Press***)
1950	Bob Lavoy	Center	(Chuck Taylor*, Associated Press***)
1953	Tom Marshall	Forward	(Look Magazine**, Associated Press***)
1953	Art Spoelstra	Center	(Associated Press***)
1954	Tom Marshall	Forward	(Associated Press*, United Press*, Look Magazine*)
1958	Ralph Crosthwaite	Center	
1962	Bobby Rascoe	Guard	
1964	Darel Carrier	Guard	(Helms Foundation)
1965	Clem Haskins	Forward	(Associated Press***, United Press***)
1966	Clem Haskins	Forward	(Associated Press, United Press, Converse*)
1967	Clem Haskins	Forward	(USBWA, Associated Press, United Press, Helms Foundation, NABC*)
1969	Jim McDaniels	Center	(Helms Foundation, Associated Press***, United Press***, Converse***)
1970	Jim McDaniels	Center	(Helms Foundation, Associated Press***, United Press***, Converse*)
1971	Jim McDaniels	Center	(NABC, USBWA, Associated Press, Sporting News, United Press, NBA)
1976	Johnny Britt	Guard	(Associated Press***)
1984	Kannard Johnson	Forward	(Sporting News All-Freshman)
1987	Tellis Frank	Forward	(Associated Press***, Sporting News***)
1989	Brett McNeal	Guard	(Associated Press***, Basketball Times***)
1993	Darnell Mee	Guard	(Associated Press***)
1996	Chris Robinson	Forward-Guard	(Basketball Weekly***)
2001	Chris Marcus	Center	(Associated Press***, Lindy's Basketball Annual)
2002	Chris Marcus	Center	(Associated Press***, Basketball America***)
2004	Mike Wells	Guard	(Associated Press***)
2006	Anthony Winchester	Guard	(Associated Press***)
2008	Courtney Lee	Guard	(Associated Press***, The NBA Draft Report**, Basketball Times**)
2009	Orlando Mendez-Valdez	Guard	(Associated Press***)
2021	Charles Bassey	Center	(Associated Press***, Basketball Times*, USBWA**, Lute Olsen)
*Second team – **Third team – ***Honorable mention

== Retired jerseys ==
The first jerseys retired in honor of Hilltopper basketball greats were hung in E.A. Diddle Arena during the 1999–2000 season. Also even though the jerseys are retired current and future players can and do use the numbers of the players whose jerseys are retired.

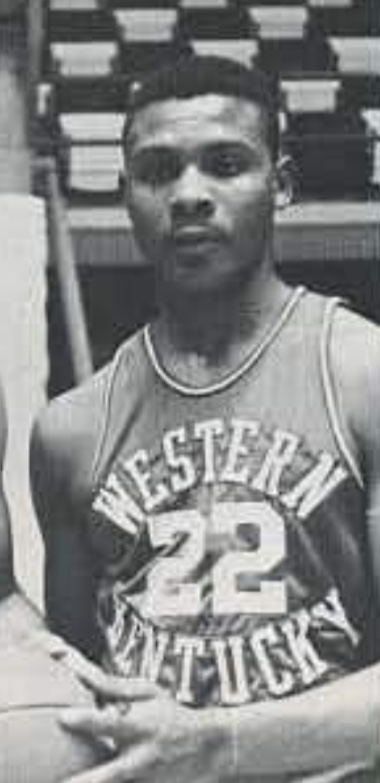
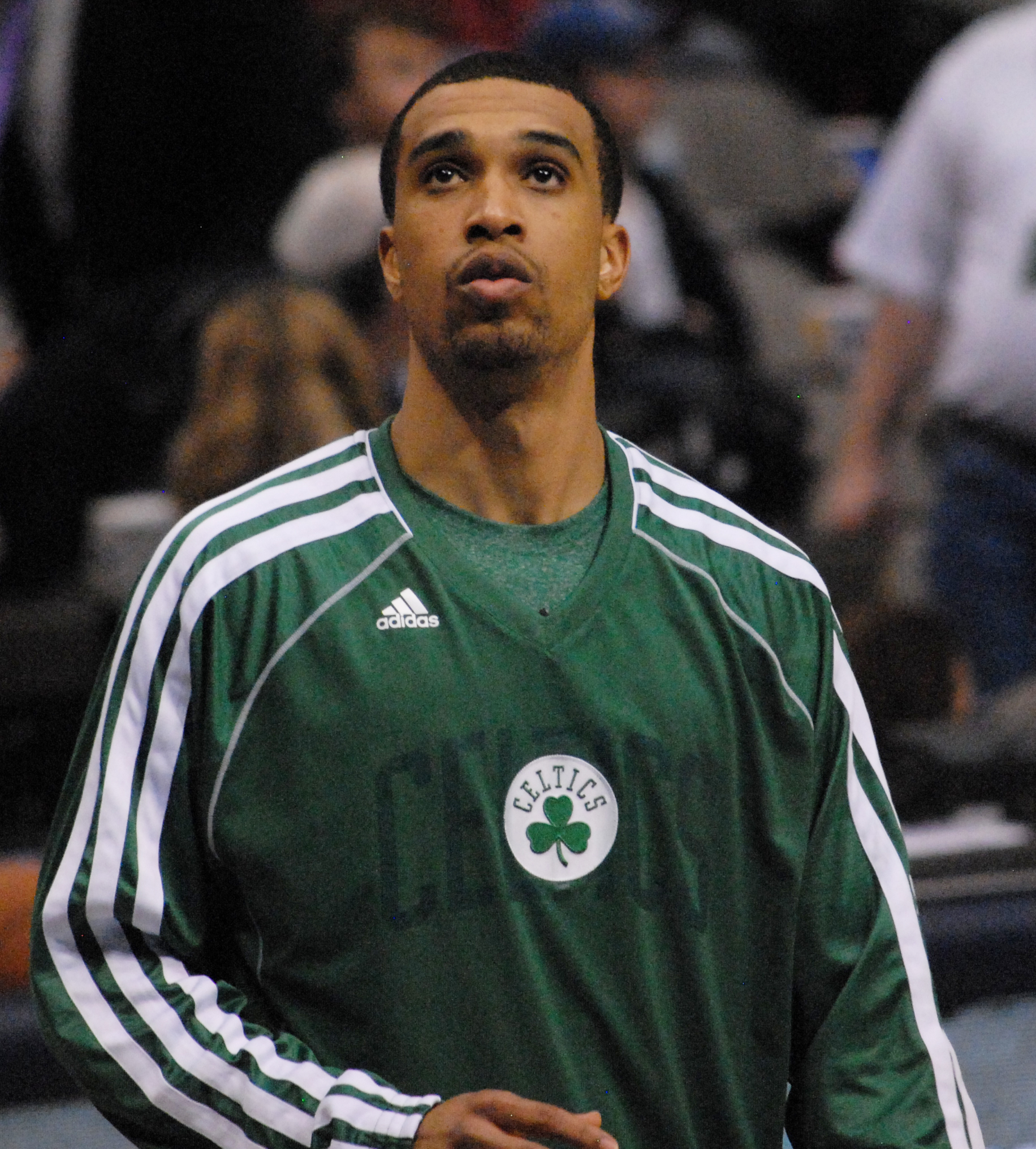
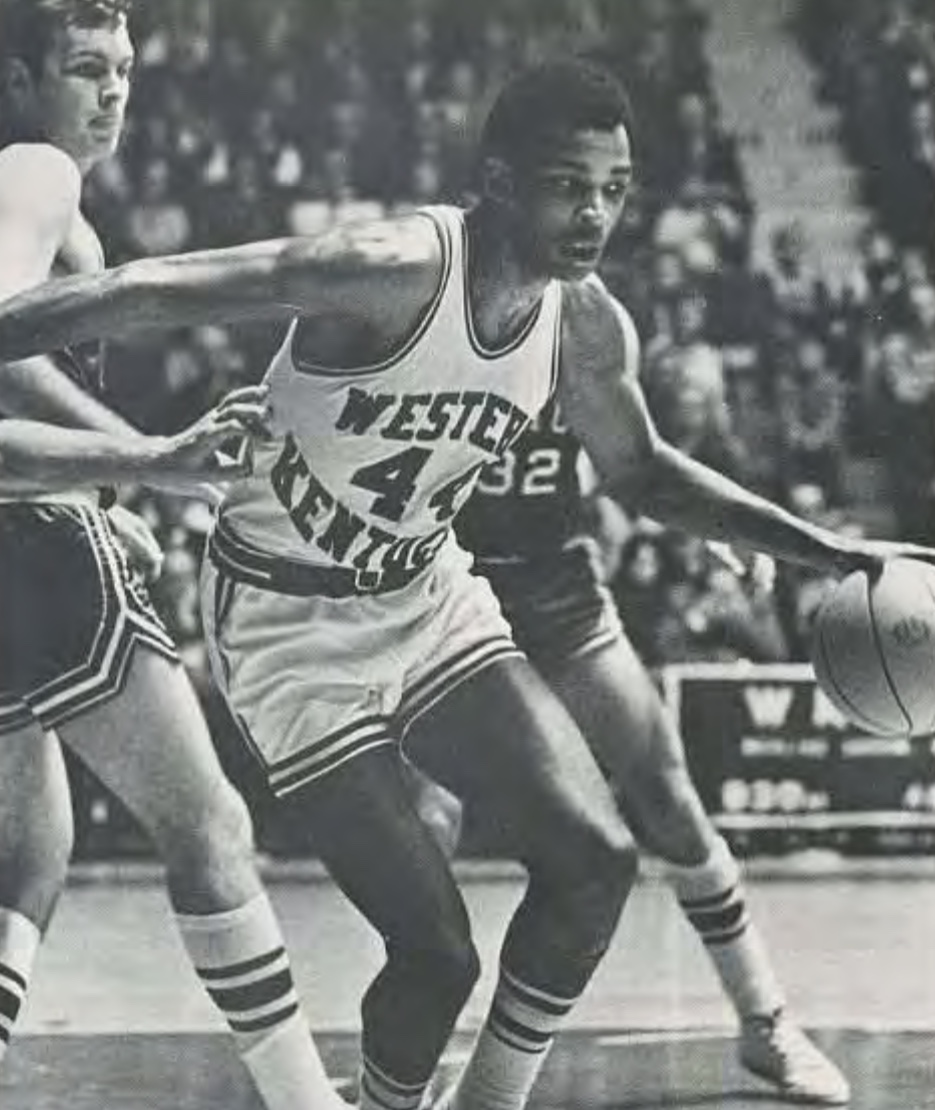
Fltr: Clem Haskins, Courtney Lee, and Jim McDaniels, whose jerseys were retired by Western Kentucky

Western Kentucky Hilltoppers retired jerseys
No.	Player	Years	Jer. ret.	Ref.
22	Clem Haskins	1964–1967	2017	
32	Courtney Lee	2004–2008	2017	
35	Darel Carrier	1961–1964	2014	
35	Dwight Smith	1964–1967	2023	
41	Tom Marshall	1951–1954		
42	John Oldham	1942–1943; 1947–1949	2011	
42	Carlisle Towery	1938–1941	2003	
44	Jim McDaniels	1968–1971	2000	
45	Bobby Rascoe	1959–1962		
—	E. A. Diddle	Coach, 1922–1964		
—	Wes Strader	Radio voice		

== Cumulative all-time statistics and achievements ==
- All Time Wins: 1,911 (18th All-time)
- All Time Winning Percentage%: .656 (8th All-Time)
- Conference Championships: 44 (3rd All-Time)
- Final Four Appearances: 1*
- Elite 8 Appearances: 2
- Sweet 16 Appearances: 8
- Round of 32 Appearances: 11
- NCAA Tournament Appearances: 24
- NBA Draft Picks: 48
- All-Americans: 30
- AP Poll Appearances 111 times
- First 30-win season by any program in NCAAB history (1937-38)

== See also ==
- List of teams with the most victories in NCAA Division I men's college basketball
