= Art Spoelstra =

American basketball player (1932–2008)

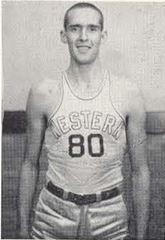
- Spoelstra as a junior at WKU

Personal information
- Born: September 11, 1932 Grand Rapids, Michigan, U.S.
- Died: April 9, 2008 (aged 75) Evansville, Indiana, U.S.
- Listed height: 6 ft 9 in (2.06 m)
- Listed weight: 220 lb (100 kg)

Career information
- High school: Godwin Heights (Grand Rapids, Michigan)
- College: Western Kentucky (1951–1954)
- NBA draft: 1954: 4th round, 34th overall pick
- Drafted by: Rochester Royals
- Playing career: 1954–1958
- Position: Center
- Number: 20, 8, 27, 18

Career history
- 1954–1957: Rochester Royals
- 1957–1958: Minneapolis Lakers
- 1958: New York Knicks

Career NBA statistics
- Points: 2,012 (7.2 ppg)
- Rebounds: 1,273 (4.6 rpg)
- Assists: 266 (1.0 apg)
- Stats at NBA.com
- Stats at Basketball Reference

Arthur Cornelius Spoelstra (September 11, 1932 – April 9, 2008) was an American basketball player. A 6'9" center from Grand Rapids, Michigan, Spoelstra played college basketball for the Western Kentucky Hilltoppers. After graduating from Western Kentucky University, he was selected by the Rochester Royals in the 1954 NBA draft (fourth round, 34th pick overall). He played four seasons in the NBA for the Royals, Minneapolis Lakers and New York Knicks. He averaged 7.2 points and 4.6 rebounds per game for his career.

Following his basketball career, Spoelstra worked in the insurance industry and the theatre. He died on April 9, 2008, in Evansville, Indiana.

== Career statistics ==
Legend
GP	Games played	GS	Games started	MPG	Minutes per game
FG%	Field goal percentage	3P%	3-point field goal percentage	FT%	Free throw percentage
RPG	Rebounds per game	APG	Assists per game	SPG	Steals per game
BPG	Blocks per game	PPG	Points per game	**Bold**	Career high

=== NBA ===
==== Regular season ====
Year	Team	GP	MPG	FG%	FT%	RPG	APG	PPG
1954–55	Rochester	70	16.1	.398	.692	4.1	.8	6.1
1955–56	Rochester	**72**	**22.8**	.392	.685	**6.1**	**1.3**	**8.5**
1956–57	Rochester	69	17.0	.388	**.733**	3.2	.8	7.6
1957–58	Minneapolis	50	22.0	**.399**	.667	5.6	1.0	7.6
1957–58	New York	17	12.2	.303	.730	3.0	.4	3.9
Career		278	18.9	.391	.693	4.6	1.0	7.2

==== Playoffs ====
Year	Team	GP	MPG	FG%	FT%	RPG	APG	PPG
1955	Rochester	3	9.3	.500	1.000	3.0	.0	5.0
