= Tom Marshall (basketball) =

American basketball player and coach (1932–2024)

Personal information
- Born: January 6, 1931 Coldwater, Tennessee, U.S.
- Died: May 10, 2024 (aged 93) Fort Myers, Florida, U.S.
- Listed height: 6 ft 4 in (1.93 m)
- Listed weight: 215 lb (98 kg)

Career information
- High school: Mount Juliet (Mount Juliet, Tennessee)
- College: Western Kentucky (1951–1954)
- NBA draft: 1954: 1st round, 7th overall pick
- Drafted by: Rochester Royals
- Playing career: 1954–1959
- Position: Small forward / shooting guard
- Number: 16, 8, 20

Career history

Playing
- 1954–1955, 1956–1957: Rochester Royals
- 1957: Detroit Pistons
- 1957–1959: Cincinnati Royals

Coaching
- 1958–1960: Cincinnati Royals

Career highlights
- Consensus second-team All-American (1954); No. 41 jersey retired by Western Kentucky Hilltoppers

Career NBA statistics
- Points: 952 (5.7 ppg)
- Rebounds: 492 (2.9 rpg)
- Assists: 188 (1.1 apg)
- Stats at NBA.com
- Stats at Basketball Reference

John Thomas Marshall (January 6, 1931 – May 10, 2024) was an American basketball player and coach. He graduated from Mount Juliet High School in Mt. Juliet, Tennessee. He was a star at Western Kentucky University in the 1950s, where he was a two-time All-American. His number 41 is one of only six retired at Western Kentucky. He was named to the OVC Half-Century Team and the OVC 40th Anniversary team. A 6'4" forward, he was drafted by the Rochester Royals with the seventh pick of the 1954 NBA draft. After a promising rookie season, he was drafted into the Army and missed the 1955–56 season. In a four-year NBA career, he played for the Royals (in both Rochester and Cincinnati), as well as for the Detroit Pistons. In his final year as a player (1958–59) he served as a player-coach; then coached the Cincinnati Royals for one additional season (1959–60) after retiring from playing. Marshall died in Fort Myers, Florida, on May 10, 2024, at the age of 93.

== Career statistics ==
Legend
GP	Games played	GS	Games started	MPG	Minutes per game
FG%	Field goal percentage	3P%	3-point field goal percentage	FT%	Free throw percentage
RPG	Rebounds per game	APG	Assists per game	SPG	Steals per game
BPG	Blocks per game	PPG	Points per game	**Bold**	Career high

=== NBA ===
==== Regular season ====
Year	Team	GP	MPG	FG%	FT%	RPG	APG	PPG
1954–55	Rochester	**72**	**18.6**	**.442**	.675	**3.6**	**1.5**	**8.0**
1956–57	Rochester	40	11.5	.344	.810	2.1	.8	4.0
1957–58	Detroit	9	7.3	.318	**.875**	.9	.4	2.3
1957–58	Cincinnati	29	15.6	.313	.745	3.2	.5	4.5
1958–59	Cincinnati	18	15.1	.291	.621	2.9	**1.5**	3.6
Career		168	15.4	.388	.709	2.9	1.1	5.7

==== Playoffs ====
Year	Team	GP	MPG	FG%	FT%	RPG	APG	PPG
1955	Rochester	**3**	**16.7**	.150	.600	5.7	.7	3.0
1958	Cincinnati	2	16.5	**.412**	**.800**	**8.0**	**1.0**	**9.0**
Career		5	16.6	.270	.700	6.6	.8	5.4

== Head coaching record ==
Team	Year	G	W	L	W–L%	Finish	PG	PW	PL	PW–L%	Result
Cincinnati	1958–59	54	16	38	.296	4th in Western	—	—	—	—	Missed playoffs
Cincinnati	1959–60	75	19	56	.253	4th in Western	—	—	—	—	Missed playoffs
Career		129	35	49	.271		0	0	0	–	
