= Navy Midshipmen men's basketball statistical leaders =

The Navy Midshipmen men's basketball statistical leaders are individual statistical leaders of the Navy Midshipmen men's basketball program in various categories, including points, assists, blocks, rebounds, and steals. Within those areas, the lists identify single-game, single-season, and career leaders. The Midshipmen represent the United States Naval Academy in the NCAA's Patriot League.

Navy began competing in intercollegiate basketball in 1907. However, the school's record book does not generally list records from before the 1950s, as records from before this period are often incomplete and inconsistent. Since scoring was much lower in this era, and teams played much fewer games during a typical season, it is likely that few or no players from this era would appear on these lists anyway.

The NCAA did not officially record assists as a stat until the 1983–84 season, and blocks and steals until the 1985–86 season, but Navy's record books includes players in these stats before these seasons. These lists are updated through the end of the 2020–21 season.

== Scoring ==
Career
Rk	Player	Points	Seasons
1	David Robinson	2,669	1983–84 1984–85 1985–86 1986–87
2	Vernon Butler	1,952	1982–83 1983–84 1984–85 1985–86
3	Austin Benigni	1,923	2022–23 2023–24 2024–25 2025–26
4	Greg Sprink	1,785	2004–05 2005–06 2006–07 2007–08
5	Kevin Sinnett	1,687	1975–76 1976–77 1977–78 1978–79
6	Chris Harris	1,635	2006–07 2007–08 2008–09 2009–10
7	Mike Heary	1,590	1994–95 1995–96 1996–97 1997–98
8	John Clune	1,561	1951–52 1952–53 1953–54
9	Kaleo Kina	1,528	2005–06 2006–07 2007–08 2008–09
10	Chris Williams	1,496	1997–98 1998–99 1999–00 2000–01

Season
Rk	Player	Points	Season
1	David Robinson	903	1986–87
2	David Robinson	796	1985–86
3	David Robinson	756	1984–85
4	Greg Sprink	653	2007–08
5	Austin Benigni	638	2024–25
6	John Clune	634	1953–54
7	Chris Harris	632	2009–10
8	Austin Benigni	612	2025–26
9	Vernon Butler	590	1984–85
10	Erik Harris	580	1990–91

Single game
Rk	Player	Points	Season	Opponent
1	David Robinson	50	1986–87	Michigan
2	David Robinson	45	1986–87	Kentucky
	David Robinson	45	1986–87	James Madison
	John Tolmie	45	1967–68	Rochester
5	David Robinson	44	1986–87	Drexel
6	David Robinson	43	1986–87	Michigan State
	Don Lange	43	1953–54	Johns Hopkins
8	John Clune	42	1953–54	Connecticut
9	John Tolmie	41	1968–69	Old Dominion
	Bill Radcliffe	41	1964–65	Hofstra

== Rebounds ==
Career
Rk	Player	Rebounds	Seasons
1	David Robinson	1,314	1983–84 1984–85 1985–86 1986–87
2	Vernon Butler	1,115	1982–83 1983–84 1984–85 1985–86
3	Eddie Reddick	875	1987–88 1988–89 1989–90 1990–91
4	Kevin Sinnett	797	1975–76 1976–77 1977–78 1978–79
5	Don Lange	785	1951–52 1952–53 1953–54
6	Donovan Draper	773	2023–24 2024–25 2025–26
7	Aidan Kehoe	758	2022–23 2023–24 2024–25 2025–26
8	Hank Kuzma	749	1974–75 1975–76 1976–77 1977–78
9	Larry Wigley	702	1951–52 1952–53 1953–54 1954–55
10	Richard Brown	645	1957–58 1958–59 1959–60

Season
Rk	Player	Rebounds	Season
1	David Robinson	455	1985–86
2	David Robinson	378	1986–87
3	Don Lange	374	1952–53
4	David Robinson	370	1984–85
5	Aidan Kehoe	369	2025–26
6	Aidan Kehoe	302	2024–25
7	Don Lange	300	1953–54
8	Vernon Butler	296	1982–83
9	Vernon Butler	292	1984–85
10	Donovan Draper	283	2023–24

Single game
Rk	Player	Rebounds	Season	Opponent
1	Don Lange	35	1952–53	Loyola
2	Don Kniss	28	1952–53	Muhlenberg
3	Don Lange	27	1952–53	Virginia
	Don Lange	27	1952–53	Johns Hopkins
5	David Robinson	25	1985–86	Fairfield
	Don Lange	25	1953–54	Johns Hopkins
7	Don Lange	24	1952–53	Army
8	Vernon Butler	23	1984–85	Delaware
	Richard Brown	23	1959–60	Baltimore
10	Vernon Butler	22	1983–84	George Mason

== Assists ==
Career
Rk	Player	Assists	Seasons
1	Doug Wojcik	714	1984–85 1985–86 1986–87
2	Brian Walker	531	1993–94 1994–95 1995–96 1996–97
3	Rob Romaine	523	1980–81 1981–82 1982–83 1983–84
4	Austin Benigni	483	2022–23 2023–24 2024–25 2025–26
5	Erik Harris	472	1987–88 1988–89 1989–90 1990–91
6	Kylor Whitaker	453	1982–83 1983–84 1984–85 1985–86
7	Tilman Dunbar	434	2012–13 2013–14 2014–15 2015–16
8	Mickey Hampton	421	1972–73 1973–74 1974–75
9	Kaleo Kina	392	2005–06 2006–07 2007–08 2008–09
10	Cliff Rees	389	1984–85 1985–86 1986–87 1987–88

Season
Rk	Player	Assists	Season
1	Doug Wojcik	251	1985–86
2	Doug Wojcik	234	1986–87
3	Doug Wojcik	229	1984–85
4	Rob Romaine	189	1982–83
5	Erik Harris	180	1990–91
6	Kylor Whitaker	169	1984–85
	Brian Walker	169	1994–95
	O.J. Avworo	169	2009–10
9	Victor Mickel	163	1991–92
10	Kylor Whitaker	160	1985–86

Single game
Rk	Player	Assists	Season	Opponent
1	Erik Harris	14	1990–91	UNC Wilmington
	Doug Wojcik	14	1984–85	East Carolina
	Doug Wojcik	14	1984–85	Loyola
	Rob Romaine	14	1982–83	Brooklyn College
	Mickey Hampton	14	1973–74	Johns Hopkins
6	O.J. Avworo	13	2009–10	Holy Cross
	Erik Harris	13	1990–91	Mount St. Mary’s
	Mickey Hampton	13	1972–73	Randolph-Macon
9	Erik Harris	12	1989–90	Penn
	Doug Wojcik	12	1986–87	Yale
	Doug Wojcik	12	1986–87	Michigan State
	Doug Wojcik	12	1985–86	William & Mary
	Doug Wojcik	12	1985–86	James Madison
	Doug Wojcik	12	1984–85	Gettysburg

== Steals ==
Career
Rk	Player	Steals	Seasons
1	Chris Williams	209	1997–98 1998–99 1999–00 2000–01
2	Brian Walker	193	1993–94 1994–95 1995–96 1996–97
3	Kaleo Kina	183	2005–06 2006–07 2007–08 2008–09
4	Hasan Abdullah	181	2015–16 2016–17 2017–18 2018–19
5	Donovan Draper	178	2023–24 2024–25 2025–26
6	Chris Harris	174	2006–07 2007–08 2008–09 2009–10
7	David Robinson	160	1983–84 1984–85 1985–86 1986–87
8	Hassan Booker	142	1994–95 1995–96 1996–97 1997–98
9	Corey Johnson	139	2004–05 2005–06 2006–07
	Skip Victor	139	1996–97 1997–98 1998–99

Season
Rk	Player	Steals	Season
1	Skip Victor	80	1998–99
2	Chris Williams	71	2000–01
3	Erik Harris	68	1990–91
4	Donovan Draper	67	2025–26
5	David Robinson	66	1986–87
6	Hasan Abdullah	65	2017–18
7	Sitapha Savane	60	1999–00
	Chris Harris	60	2009–10
	Hasan Abdullah	60	2016–17
10	David Robinson	59	1985–86
	Donovan Draper	59	2023–24

Single game
Rk	Player	Steals	Season	Opponent
1	Jehiel Lewis	12	2001–02	Bucknell
2	Chris Williams	8	2000–01	Texas
3	Mike Woods	7	2024–25	Loyola Maryland
	Skip Victor	7	1998–99	Gettysburg
	Brian Walker	7	1995–96	Lehigh
	Erik Harris	7	1990–91	UNC Wilmington
7	Hasan Abdullah	6	2017–18	Coppin State
	Shawn Anderson	6	2016–17	Holy Cross
	Hasan Abdullah	6	2016–17	UNCG
	J. J. Avila	6	2011–12	American
	J. J. Avila	6	2011–12	Army
	Corey Johnson	6	2004–05	Lehigh
	Jason Jeanpierrie	6	2002–03	Belmont
	Chris Williams	6	2000–01	Coast Guard
	Skip Victor	6	1998–99	Army
	Chris Williams	6	1997–98	Bucknell
	Hassan Booker	6	1996–97	Gettysburg
	Erik Harris	6	1990–91	Cleveland State
	Erik Harris	6	1990–91	Mount St. Mary’s
	Vernon Butler	6	1984–85	UNC Wilmington
	Myron Simons	6	1979–80	Delaware

== Blocks ==
NCAA Division I record

Career
Rk	Player	Blocks	Seasons
1	David Robinson	516	1983–84 1984–85 1985–86 1986–87
2	Will Kelly	199	2012–13 2013–14 2014–15 2015–16
3	Sitapha Savane	189	1997–98 1998–99 1999–00
4	Cliff Maurer	151	1981–82 1982–83 1983–84
5	Mark Veazey	111	2007–08 2008–09 2009–10 2010–11
6	Josh Williams	108	1995–96 1996–97 1997–98 1998–99
7	Michael Cunningham	107	1998–99 1999–00 2000–01
	Worth Smith	107	2011–12 2012–13 2013–14 2014–15
9	Nick Marusich	101	1988–89 1989–90 1990–91 1991–92
10	Aidan Kehoe	97	2022–23 2023–24 2024–25 2025–26

Season
Rk	Player	Blocks	Season
1	David Robinson	207	1985–86
2	David Robinson	144	1986–87
3	David Robinson	128	1984–85
4	Sitapha Savane	111	1999–00
5	Will Kelly	87	2015–16
6	Cliff Maurer	75	1983–84
7	Byron Hopkins	74	1987–88
8	Cliff Maurer	68	1982–83
9	Michael Cunningham	62	2000–01
10	Will Kelly	57	2014–15

Single game
Rk	Player	Blocks	Season	Opponent
1	David Robinson	14	1985–86	UNC Wilmington
2	David Robinson	12	1985–86	James Madison
3	David Robinson	10	1986–87	Kentucky
	David Robinson	10	1985–86	East Carolina
	David Robinson	10	1985–86	William & Mary
	David Robinson	10	1984–85	James Madison
7	Sitapha Savane	9	1999–00	William & Mary
	Byron Hopkins	9	1987–88	William & Mary
	David Robinson	9	1985–86	Cleveland State
10	Will Kelly	8	2015–16	Colgate
	Will Kelly	8	2014–15	Army
	David Robinson	8	1986–87	UNC Wilmington
	David Robinson	8	1985–86	William & Mary
	David Robinson	8	1985–86	Penn State
	Cliff Maurer	8	1982–83	Harvard
