= 1996–97 Navy Midshipmen men's basketball team =

American college basketball season

1996–97 Navy Midshipmen men's basketball

Patriot League tournament champions Patriot League Regular Season Champions

NCAA men's Division I tournament
- Conference: Patriot League
- Record: 20–9 (10–2 Patriot)
- Head coach: Don DeVoe (5th season)
- Home arena: Alumni Hall

1996–97 Patriot League men's basketball standings
| | Conf. | | | | Overall |
| Team | W | | L | PCT | W | | L | PCT |
|---|---|---|---|---|---|---|---|---|
| Navy † | 10 | – | 2 | .833 | 20 | – | 9 | .690 |
| Bucknell | 9 | – | 3 | .750 | 18 | – | 11 | .621 |
| Colgate | 8 | – | 4 | .667 | 12 | – | 16 | .429 |
| Holy Cross | 5 | – | 7 | .417 | 8 | – | 19 | .296 |
| Lafayette | 5 | – | 7 | .417 | 11 | – | 17 | .393 |
| Army | 4 | – | 8 | .333 | 10 | – | 16 | .385 |
| Lehigh | 1 | – | 11 | .083 | 1 | – | 26 | .037 |
† 1997 Patriot League tournament winner

The 1996–97 Navy Midshipmen men's basketball team represented the United States Naval Academy during the 1996–97 NCAA Division I men's basketball season. The Midshipmen were led by first-year head coach Pete Herrmann, and played their home games at Alumni Hall in Annapolis, Maryland as members of the Patriot League.

== Roster ==
1996–97 Navy Midshipmen men's basketball team
| Players | Coaches |
|---|---|
| Pos. / # / Name / Height / Weight / Year / Previous school / Hometown; G/F / 35 / Hassan Booker / 6 ft 3 in (1.91 m) / — / Jr / University HS / Los Angeles, California | Head coach: Don DeVoe; Assistant coach(es) Legend: (C) Team captain; (S) Suspended; (I) Ineligible; (W) Walk-on; Injured; Current redshirt |

== Schedule and results ==
| Date time, TV | Rank^{#} | Opponent^{#} | Result | Record | Site (attendance) city, state |
Non Conference Regular season
| Nov 22, 1996* | | Coast Guard | W 84–51 | 1–0 | Alumni Hall (2,631); Annapolis, Maryland |
| Nov 24, 1996* | | at Towson | L 68–76 | 1–1 | Towson Center (1,003); Towson, Maryland |
| Nov 26, 1996* | | Pittsburgh | W 60–49 | 2–1 | Alumni Hall (2,259); Annapolis, Maryland |
| Nov 30, 1996* | | at Air Force | W 78–59 | 3–1 | Clune Arena (1,279); Colorado Springs, Colorado |
| Dec 3, 1996* | | New Hampshire | W 89–81 | 4–1 | Alumni Hall (1,165); Annapolis, Maryland |
| Dec 5, 1996* | | at VMI | W 68–62 | 5–1 | Cameron Hall (1,043); Lexington, Virginia |
| Dec 7, 1996* | | at Wofford | L 65–89 | 5–2 | Benjamin Johnson Arena (1,684); Spartanburg, South Carolina |
| Dec 9, 1996* | | Gettysburg | W 78–64 | 6–2 | Alumni Hall (1,078); Annapolis, Maryland |
| Dec 21, 1996* | | Dartmouth | L 63–77 | 6–3 | Alumni Hall (1,475); Annapolis, Maryland |
| Dec 23, 1996* | | at St. Bonaventure | L 69–85 | 6–4 | Reilly Center (5,247); St. Bonaventure, New York |
| Dec 28, 1996* | | at No. 23 Stanford | L 68–85 | 6–5 | Maples Pavilion (7,149); Stanford, California |
| Dec 30, 1996* | | at Rice | L 52–69 | 6–6 | Tudor Fieldhouse (4,030); Houston, Texas |
| Jan 2, 1997* | | Harvard | W 66–63 | 7–6 | Alumni Hall (1,059); Annapolis, Maryland |
Conference Regular Season
| Jan 8, 1997 | | at Army | W 70–56 | 8–6 (1–0) | Christl Arena (2,632); West Point, New York |
| Jan 11, 1997 | | at Colgate | L 60–64 | 8–7 (1–1) | Cotterell Court (2,400); Hamilton, New York |
| Jan 13, 1997* | | William & Mary | W 74–63 | 9–7 (1–1) | Alumni Hall (1,011); Annapolis, Maryland |
| Jan 15, 1997 | | at Lehigh | W 70–64 | 10–7 (2–1) | Stabler Arena (942); Bethlehem, Pennsylvania |
| Jan 18, 1997 | | Lafayette | W 60–55 | 11–7 (3–1) | Alumni Hall (2,592); Annapolis, Maryland |
| Jan 22, 1997 | | at Bucknell | L 55–69 | 11–8 (3–2) | Davis Gym (2,248); Lewisburg, Pennsylvania |
| Jan 29, 1997 | | Holy Cross | W 83–75 | 12–8 (4–2) | Alumni Hall (1,861); Annapolis, Maryland |
| Feb 1, 1997 | | Army | W 68–64 | 13–8 (5–2) | Alumni Hall (5,710); Annapolis, Maryland |
| Feb 5, 1997 | | Colgate | W 79–56 | 14–8 (6–2) | Alumni Hall (3,428); Annapolis, Maryland |
| Feb 8, 1997 | | Lehigh | W 109–73 | 15–8 (7–2) | Alumni Hall (1,945); Annapolis, Maryland |
| Feb 12, 1997 | | at Lafayette | W 74–72 | 16–8 (8–2) | Kirby Sports Center (1,029); Easton, Pennsylvania |
| Feb 15, 1997 | | Bucknell | W 78–67 | 17–8 (9–2) | Alumni Hall (3,732); Annapolis, Maryland |
| Jan 2, 1997 | | at Holy Cross | W 76–61 | 18–8 (10–2) | Hart Center (2,833); Worcester, Massachusetts |
Patriot League tournament
| Mar 2, 1997* | | vs. Lafayette; Semifinals | W 96–57 | 19–8 | Stabler Arena (3,438); Bethlehem, Pennsylvania |
| Mar 6, 1997* | | Bucknell; Championship game | W 76–75 | 20–8 | Alumni Hall (3,052); Annapolis, Maryland |
NCAA tournament
| Mar 14, 1997* | (15 W) | vs. (2 W) No. 2 Utah; First round | L 61–75 | 20–9 | McKale Center (12,958); Tucson, Arizona |
*Non-conference game. ^{#}Rankings from AP Poll. (#) Tournament seedings in parentheses. W=West. All times are in Eastern Time.
