= 1979 SEC men's basketball tournament =

American college basketball tournament

- Classification: Division I
- Season: 1978–79
- Teams: 10
- Site: Birmingham-Jefferson Civic Center; Birmingham, Alabama
- Champions: Tennessee Volunteers (4th title)
- Winning coach: Don DeVoe (1st title)
- MVP: Kyle Macy (Kentucky)
- Television: The C.D. Chesley Company

1978–79 Southeastern Conference men's basketball standings
	Conf.				Overall
Team	W		L	PCT	W		L	PCT
No. 7 LSU	14	–	4	.778	23	–	6	.793
Tennessee †	12	–	6	.667	21	–	12	.636
Vanderbilt	11	–	7	.611	18	–	9	.667
Alabama	11	–	7	.611	22	–	11	.667
Mississippi State	11	–	7	.611	19	–	9	.679
Kentucky	10	–	8	.556	19	–	12	.613
Georgia	7	–	11	.389	14	–	14	.500
Ole Miss	6	–	12	.333	11	–	16	.407
Auburn	5	–	13	.278	13	–	16	.448
Florida	3	–	15	.167	8	–	19	.296
† 1979 SEC tournament winner Rankings from AP poll

The 1979 SEC men's basketball tournament took place in Birmingham, Alabama, at the Birmingham Jefferson Convention Complex. This tournament marks the first SEC Men’s Basketball Tournament held since the event’s hiatus that started after the 1952 tournament.

The Tennessee Volunteers won the tournament championship game, and received the SEC's automatic bid to the NCAA tournament by beating the Kentucky Wildcats in a 75–69 overtime win on March 3, 1979. The tournament took place from February 28 to March 3, 1979. After the SEC tournament ended, Tennessee was ranked number 20 in the Associated Press polls.

With the return of the SEC tournament, the SEC awarded the winner of the tournament the SEC Tournament Championship and the conference's NCAA tournament bid. The conference continued to award the SEC Championship to the team with the best conference record during the regular season.

== Television coverage ==
The 1979 tournament marks the first time that the SEC tournament was broadcast on television. Television coverage of the tournament was produced by The C.D. Chesley Company, who syndicated the coverage of the games regionally via a network of 28 television stations. C.D. Chesley was known as the pioneer in syndicated college basketball broadcasts as he started production of the first package of Atlantic Coast Conference basketball telecasts in the late 1950s.

== Bracket ==
First Round; Wednesday, February 28
4	Alabama	81
10	Florida	64
6	Kentucky	82
8	Ole Miss	77
5	Mississippi State	72
7	Georgia	75
3	Vanderbilt	53
9	Auburn	59

Quarterfinals; Thursday, March 1
4	Alabama	100
6	Kentucky	101
7	Georgia	91
9	Auburn ^{4OT}	95

Semifinals; Friday, March 2
1	#8 LSU	67
6	Kentucky	80
2	Tennessee	75
9	Auburn	64

Final; Saturday, March 3
6	Kentucky	69
2	Tennessee ^{OT}	75

== All-tournament team ==
- G - Kyle Macy, UK (MVP)
- G - Truman Claytor, UK
- F - Terry Crosby, TENN
- F - Reginald King, ALA
- F - John Stroud, MISS
