= Eastern Kentucky Colonels men's basketball statistical leaders =

The Eastern Kentucky Colonels men's basketball statistical leaders are individual statistical leaders of the Eastern Kentucky Colonels men's basketball program in various categories, including points, rebounds, assists, steals, and blocks. Within those areas, the lists identify single-game, single-season, and career leaders. The Colonels represent Eastern Kentucky University in the NCAA Division I United Athletic Conference.

Eastern Kentucky began competing in intercollegiate basketball in 1909. However, the school's record book does not generally list records from before the 1950s, as records from before this period are often incomplete and inconsistent. Since scoring was much lower in this era, and teams played much fewer games during a typical season, it is likely that few or no players from this era would appear on these lists anyway.

The NCAA did not officially record assists as a stat until the 1983–84 season, and blocks and steals until the 1985–86 season, but Eastern Kentucky's record books includes players in these stats before these seasons. These lists are updated through the end of the 2021–22 season.

== Scoring ==
Career
Rk	Player	Points	Seasons
1	Nick Mayo	2,316	2015–16 2016–17 2017–18 2018–19
2	Devontae Blanton	2,050	2020–21 2021–22 2022–23 2023–24 2024–25
3	Matt Witt	1,832	2002–03 2003–04 2004–05 2005–06
4	Mike Rose	1,763	2005–06 2006–07 2007–08 2008–09
5	Antonio Parris	1,723	1983–84 1984–85 1985–86 1986–87
6	John Allen	1,635	1990–91 1991–92 1992–93 1993–94
7	Michael Moreno	1,628	2019–20 2020–21 2021–22 2022–23 2023–24
8	Arlando Johnson	1,617	1991–92 1992–93 1993–94 1994–95
9	Carl Brown	1,592	1972–73 1973–74 1974–75 1975–76
10	Eddie Bodkin	1,587	1963–64 1964–65 1965–66

Season
Rk	Player	Points	Season
1	James Tillman	780	1978–79

Single game
Rk	Player	Points	Season	Opponent
1	Jack Adams	49	1955–56	Union

== Rebounds ==
Career
Rk	Player	Rebounds	Seasons
1	Mike Smith	977	1988–89 1989–90 1990–91 1991–92
2	Michael Moreno	958	2019–20 2020–21 2021–22 2022–23 2023–24
3	Jim Baechtold	933	1948–49 1949–50 1950–51 1951–52
4	Garfield Smith	884	1965–66 1966–67 1967–68
5	Jack Adams	870	1953–54 1954–55 1955–56
6	Mike Oliver	859	1974–75 1975–76 1976–77 1977–78
7	Devontae Blanton	837	2020–21 2021–22 2022–23 2023–24 2024–25
8	Nick Mayo	834	2015–16 2016–17 2017–18 2018–19
9	Eddie Bodkin	812	1963–64 1964–65 1965–66
10	Carl Greenfield	802	1968–69 1969–70 1970–71

Season
Rk	Player	Rebounds	Season
1	Garfield Smith	472	1967–68

Single game
Rk	Player	Rebounds	Season	Opponent
1	Garfield Smith	33	1967–68	Marshall

== Assists ==
Career
Rk	Player	Assists	Seasons
1	Bruce Jones	699	1977–78 1978–79 1979–80 1980–81
2	Matt Witt	630	2002–03 2003–04 2004–05 2005–06
3	John DeCamillis	626	1982–83 1983–84 1984–85 1985–86
4	Devontae Blanton	429	2020–21 2021–22 2022–23 2023–24 2024–25
5	Jeff McGill	414	1985–86 1986–87 1987–88
6	Arlando Johnson	393	1991–92 1992–93 1993–94 1994–95
7	Justin Stommes	300	2007–08 2008–09 2009–10 2010–11
8	Bobby Collins	296	1984–85 1985–86 1986–87 1987–88
9	Jamie Ross	295	1988–89 1989–90 1990–91 1991–92
10	Kenny Elliott	292	1975–76 1976–77 1977–78 1978–79

Season
Rk	Player	Assists	Season
1	Bruce Jones	243	1978–79

Single game
Rk	Player	Assists	Season	Opponent
1	Leland Walker	16	2023–24	Wilberforce
2	Wendell Green Jr.	15	2020–21	Tennessee Tech

== Steals ==
Career
Rk	Player	Steals	Seasons
1	Corey Walden	236	2012–13 2013–14 2014–15
2	Jamie Ross	221	1988–89 1989–90 1990–91 1991–92
3	Bobby Collins	190	1984–85 1985–86 1986–87 1987–88
4	John Allen	187	1990–91 1991–92 1992–93 1993–94
5	Mike Rose	184	2005–06 2006–07 2007–08 2008–09
6	Jomaru Brown	181	2018–19 2019–20 2020–21 2021–22
7	DeMarkus Doss	172	1992–93 1993–94 1994–95 1995–96
8	Michael Moreno	168	2019–20 2020–21 2021–22 2022–23 2023–24
9	Cooper Robb	162	2020–21 2021–22 2022–23
10	Michael Haney	154	2001–02 2002–03 2003–04 2004–05
	Isaac McGlone	154	2013–14 2014–15 2015–16 2016–17

Season
Rk	Player	Steals	Season
1	Corey Walden	99	2014–15

Single game
Rk	Player	Steals	Season	Opponent
1	Drae Vasser	10	2026–27	Kentucky State
2	Corey Walden	8	2014–15	Savannah State
	Kelvin Robinson	8	2018–19	Tennessee Tech
	Cooper Robb	8	2020–21	High Point

== Blocks ==
Career
Rk	Player	Blocks	Seasons
1	Isaiah Cozart	210	2022–23 2023–24
2	Nick Mayo	177	2015–16 2016–17 2017–18 2018–19

Season
Rk	Player	Blocks	Season
1	Isaiah Cozart	116	2023–24
2	Isaiah Cozart	94	2022–23
3	Nick Mayo	55	2018–19
