= 1979 Ohio Valley Conference men's basketball tournament =

Men's Basketball Tournament

- Classification: Division I
- Season: 1978–79
- Teams: 4
- Site: McBrayer Arena; Richmond,Kentucky
- Champions: Eastern Kentucky (3rd title)
- Winning coach: Ed Byhre (1st title)

1978–79 Ohio Valley Conference men's basketball standings
	Conf.				Overall
Team	W		L	PCT	W		L	PCT
Eastern Kentucky †	9	–	3	.750	21	–	8	.724
Western Kentucky	7	–	5	.583	17	–	11	.607
Morehead State	7	–	5	.583	14	–	13	.519
Middle Tennessee	7	–	5	.583	16	–	11	.593
Tennessee Tech	7	–	5	.583	11	–	15	.423
Austin Peay State	3	–	9	.250	8	–	18	.308
Murray State	2	–	10	.167	4	–	22	.154
† 1979 OVC tournament winner Rankings from AP Poll

The 1979 Ohio Valley Conference men's basketball tournament was the postseason men's basketball tournament of the Ohio Valley Conference during the 1979–80 NCAA Division I men's basketball season. It was held March 2–3, 1979. The semifinals and finals took place at E. A. Diddle Arena in Bowling Green, Kentucky. Top seed Eastern Kentucky won the tournament, defeating Western Kentucky Hilltoppers in the championship game, and received the Ohio Valley's automatic bid to the NCAA tournament. The Colonels drew a 9 seed in the Mideast region, facing the 8 seed Tennessee.

== Format ==
The top four eligible men's basketball teams in the Ohio Valley Conference received a berth in the conference tournament. After the 14-game conference season, teams were seeded by conference record. The bottom four teams in the standings did not participate.

== Bracket ==
Semifinals; March 2
1	Eastern Kentucky	90
4	Middle Tennessee State	81
3	Morehead State	85
2	Western Kentucky	90

Finals; March 3
1	Eastern Kentucky	78
2	Western Kentucky	77
