= 1998 Patriot League men's basketball tournament =

College basketball tournament

- Classification: Division I
- Season: 1997–98
- Teams: 7
- Site: Alumni Hall; Annapolis, Maryland
- Champions: Navy (3rd title)
- Winning coach: Don DeVoe (3rd title)
- MVP: Skip Victor (Navy)

1997–98 Patriot League men's basketball standings
	Conf.				Overall
Team	W		L	PCT	W		L	PCT
Lafayette	10	–	2	.833	19	–	9	.679
Navy †	10	–	2	.833	19	–	11	.633
Bucknell	8	–	4	.667	13	–	15	.464
Colgate	5	–	7	.417	10	–	18	.357
Lehigh	4	–	8	.333	10	–	17	.370
Holy Cross	3	–	9	.250	7	–	20	.259
Army	2	–	10	.167	8	–	19	.296
† 1998 Patriot League tournament winner

The 1998 Patriot League men's basketball tournament was played at Alumni Hall in Annapolis, Maryland after the conclusion of the 1997–98 regular season. Number two seed Navy defeated top seed Lafayette, 93–85 in the championship game, to win its third Patriot League Tournament title. The Midshipmen earned an automatic bid to the 1998 NCAA tournament as #16 seed in the East region.

== Format ==
All seven league members participated in the tournament, with teams seeded according to regular season conference record. Play began with the quarterfinal round, with the top seed receiving a bye to the semifinal round.

== Bracket ==
Quarterfinals; February 28
4	Colgate	84
5	Lehigh	83
3	Bucknell	60
6	Holy Cross	56
2	Navy	79
7	Army	52

Semifinals; March 1
1	Lafayette	83
4	Colgate	77
3	Bucknell	61
2	Navy	80

Championship game March 5
1	Lafayette	85
2	Navy	93
