= 1978–79 Western Kentucky Hilltoppers basketball team =

American college basketball season

1978–79 Western Kentucky Hilltoppers basketball
- Conference: Ohio Valley Conference
- Record: 17–11 (7–5 OVC)
- Head coach: Gene Keady
- Assistant coach: Clem Haskins
- Home arena: E. A. Diddle Arena

1978–79 Ohio Valley Conference men's basketball standings
	Conf.				Overall
Team	W		L	PCT	W		L	PCT
Eastern Kentucky †	9	–	3	.750	21	–	8	.724
Western Kentucky	7	–	5	.583	17	–	11	.607
Morehead State	7	–	5	.583	14	–	13	.519
Middle Tennessee	7	–	5	.583	16	–	11	.593
Tennessee Tech	7	–	5	.583	11	–	15	.423
Austin Peay State	3	–	9	.250	8	–	18	.308
Murray State	2	–	10	.167	4	–	22	.154
† 1979 OVC tournament winner Rankings from AP Poll

The 1978–79 Western Kentucky Hilltoppers men's basketball team represented Western Kentucky University during the 1978–79 NCAA Division I men's basketball season. The Hilltoppers were members of the Ohio Valley Conference and led by future National Collegiate Basketball Hall of Fame coach Gene Keady in his first year as head coach. WKU finished tied for second in the OVC regular season. The conference tournament was hosted by regular season champion Eastern Kentucky. Western Kentucky had defeated EKU twice during the season, but their third meeting in the conference tournament championship ended in controversy. The Hilltoppers held a one-point lead when the game clock expired, however, due to crowd noise, the referees and time keeper did not hear the buzzer. A foul was called on WKU with no time left and Eastern Kentucky made two free throws to win the game. A review of game film afterwards showed that the foul was called 3.5 seconds after the game clock had ended. Western Kentucky appealed to the OVC Commissioner, however, their appeal was denied. This perceived wrong was a factor in Western Kentucky's decision to leave the OVC in 1982. Greg Jackson and Trey Trumbo were named to the All-OVC Team, and Jackson was OVC Tournament MVP.

== Schedule ==
Date time, TV	Rank^{#}	Opponent^{#}	Result	Record	Site city, state
Regular season
11/25/1978*		No. 1 Duke	L 53–78	0–1	E. A. Diddle Arena; Bowling Green, KY
11/27/1978*		Jacksonville State	W 71–59	1–1	E. A. Diddle Arena; Bowling Green, KY
11/30/1978*		at Florida State	L 59–70	1–2	Tully Gymnasium; Tallahassee, FL
12/2/1978*		Bowling Green State	W 70–48	2–2	E. A. Diddle Arena; Bowling Green, KY
12/4/1978*		Mississippi College	W 56–53	3–2	E. A. Diddle Arena; Bowling Green, KY
12/9/1978*		at Evansville	W 63–60	4–2	Roberts Municipal Stadium; Evansville, IN
12/15/1978*		Davidson	W 103–81	5–2	E. A. Diddle Arena; Bowling Green, KY
12/18/1978*		Illinois State	L 74–75 ^{OT}	5–3	E. A. Diddle Arena; Bowling Green, KY
12/30/1978*		at Butler	W 71–65	6–3	Hinkle Fieldhouse; Indianapolis, IN
1/6/1979*		Wisconsin-Milwaukee	W 89–66	7–3	E. A. Diddle Arena; Bowling Green, KY
1/10/1979*		at La Salle	L 66–90	7–4	Palestra; Philadelphia, PA
1/15/1979		at Tennessee Tech	L 68–75	7–5 (0-1)	Eblen Center; Cookeville, TN
1/17/1979		Morehead State	W 78–76	8–5 (1-1)	E. A. Diddle Arena; Bowling Green, KY
1/20/1979		at Murray State	L 65–67	8–6 (1-2)	Racer Arena; Murray, KY
1/22/1979		Austin Peay	W 85–61	9–6 (2-2)	E. A. Diddle Arena; Bowling Green, KY
1/24/1979*		at Dayton	W 78–72	10–6	UD Arena; Dayton, OH
2/21/1980		Middle Tennessee	W 72–70 ^{2OT}	11–6 (3-2)	E. A. Diddle Arena; Bowling Green, KY
1/29/1979		Eastern Kentucky	W 70–65	12–6 (4-2)	E. A. Diddle Arena; Bowling Green, KY
2/1/1979*		CCNY	W 104–50	13–6	E. A. Diddle Arena; Bowling Green, KY
2/3/1979		at Morehead State	L 81–83	13–7 (4-3)	Wetherby Gymnasium; Morehead, KY
2/5/1979		at Eastern Kentucky	W 70–65	14–7 (5-3)	Alumni Coliseum; Richmond, KY
2/10/1979*		at East Tennessee	L 64–65	14–8	Memorial Center; Johnson City, TN
2/12/1979		Tennessee Tech	W 80–66	15–8 (6-3)	E. A. Diddle Arena; Bowling Green, KY
2/17/1979		at Austin Peay	W 78–66	16–8 (7-3)	Dunn Center; Clarksville, TN
2/19/1979		Murray State	L 64–66	16–9 (7-4)	E. A. Diddle Arena; Bowling Green, KY
2/24/1979		at Middle Tennessee	L 76–81	16–10 (7-5)	Murphy Center; Murfreesboro, TN
1979 Ohio Valley Conference Men's Basketball Tournament
3/2/1979	(2)	vs. (3) Morehead State; Semifinals	W 90–85	17–10	Alumni Coliseum; Richmond, KY
3/3/1979	(2)	at (1) Eastern Kentucky; Championship	L 77–78	17–11	Alumni Coliseum; Richmond, KY
*Non-conference game. ^{#}Rankings from AP Poll. (#) Tournament seedings in parentheses.
