= Carver Academy =

Public charter school in Texas, U.S.

Coordinates: 29.421213°N 98.472912°W

IDEA Carver Academy is a public charter school located in San Antonio, Texas, USA. Initially established as a Christian private school, Carver Academy was founded by David Robinson, basketball Hall of famer & former NBA basketball player with the San Antonio Spurs, and his wife Valerie. The school was founded in 2001 and is named after George Washington Carver. In 2012, the Carver Academy converted to a tuition-free, charter school as part of the IDEA Public Schools network. In April 2019, Carver became the first IDEA graduating class in San Antonio.
