= 1978–79 Kentucky Wildcats men's basketball team =

1978–79 season of University of Kentucky men's basketball team

1978–79 Kentucky Wildcats men's basketball
- Conference: Southeastern Conference
- Record: 19–12 (10–8 SEC)
- Head coach: Joe B. Hall (7th season)
- Assistant coaches: Joe Dean; Leonard Hamilton; Dick Parsons
- Home arena: Rupp Arena

1978–79 Southeastern Conference men's basketball standings
	Conf.				Overall
Team	W		L	PCT	W		L	PCT
No. 7 LSU	14	–	4	.778	23	–	6	.793
Tennessee †	12	–	6	.667	21	–	12	.636
Vanderbilt	11	–	7	.611	18	–	9	.667
Alabama	11	–	7	.611	22	–	11	.667
Mississippi State	11	–	7	.611	19	–	9	.679
Kentucky	10	–	8	.556	19	–	12	.613
Georgia	7	–	11	.389	14	–	14	.500
Ole Miss	6	–	12	.333	11	–	16	.407
Auburn	5	–	13	.278	13	–	16	.448
Florida	3	–	15	.167	8	–	19	.296
† 1979 SEC tournament winner Rankings from AP poll

The 1978–79 Kentucky Wildcats men's basketball team represented University of Kentucky in the 1978–79 NCAA Division I men's basketball season. The head coach was Joe B. Hall and the team finished the season with an overall record of 19–12 (10–8 SEC). Kentucky did not qualifty for the NCAA Tournament but they did participate in the 1979 National Invitation Tournament. In their first round matchup the Wildcats lost to the Clemson Tigers 68–67.

== Roster ==
1978–79 Kentucky Wildcats men's basketball team
Players	Coaches
Pos. / # / Name / Height / Weight / Year / Previous school / Hometown; G / 23 / Dwight Anderson / 6 ft 3 in (1.91 m) / 175 lb (79 kg) / Fr / Roth / Dayton, Ohio	Head coach: Joe B. Hall (Kentucky); Assistant coach(es) Legend: (C) Team captain; (S) Suspended; (I) Ineligible; (W) Walk-on; Injured; Current redshirt
