= 1997 Patriot League men's basketball tournament =

- Classification: Division I
- Season: 1996–97
- Teams: 7
- Site: Stabler Arena; Bethlehem, Pennsylvania
- Finals site: Alumni Hall; Annapolis, Maryland
- Champions: Navy (2nd title)
- Winning coach: Don DeVoe (2nd title)
- MVP: Hassan Booker (Navy)

1996–97 Patriot League men's basketball standings
	Conf.				Overall
Team	W		L	PCT	W		L	PCT
Navy †	10	–	2	.833	20	–	9	.690
Bucknell	9	–	3	.750	18	–	11	.621
Colgate	8	–	4	.667	12	–	16	.429
Holy Cross	5	–	7	.417	8	–	19	.296
Lafayette	5	–	7	.417	11	–	17	.393
Army	4	–	8	.333	10	–	16	.385
Lehigh	1	–	11	.083	1	–	26	.037
† 1997 Patriot League tournament winner

The 1997 Patriot League men's basketball tournament was played at Stabler Arena in Bethlehem, Pennsylvania, and Alumni Hall in Annapolis, Maryland, after the conclusion of the 1996–97 regular season. Top seed Navy defeated #2 seed Bucknell, 76–75 in the championship game, to win its second Patriot League Tournament title. The Midshipmen earned an automatic bid to the 1997 NCAA tournament as #15 seed in the West region.

== Format ==
All eight league members participated in the tournament, with teams seeded according to regular season conference record. Play began with the quarterfinal round.

== Bracket ==
Quarterfinals; March 1
4	Holy Cross	65
5	Lafayette	70
3	Colgate	104
6	Army	79
2	Bucknell	84
7	Lehigh	54

Semifinals; March 2
1	Navy	91
5	Lafayette	57
3	Colgate	58
2	Bucknell	71

Championship game March 6
1	Navy	76
2	Bucknell	75
