= 1997–98 Navy Midshipmen men's basketball team =

American college basketball season

1997–98 Navy Midshipmen men's basketball

Patriot League tournament champions Patriot League Regular Season Champions

NCAA men's Division I tournament
- Conference: Patriot League
- Record: 19–11 (10–2 Patriot)
- Head coach: Don DeVoe (2nd season)
- Home arena: Alumni Hall

1997–98 Patriot League men's basketball standings
	Conf.				Overall
Team	W		L	PCT	W		L	PCT
Lafayette	10	–	2	.833	19	–	9	.679
Navy †	10	–	2	.833	19	–	11	.633
Bucknell	8	–	4	.667	13	–	15	.464
Colgate	5	–	7	.417	10	–	18	.357
Lehigh	4	–	8	.333	10	–	17	.370
Holy Cross	3	–	9	.250	7	–	20	.259
Army	2	–	10	.167	8	–	19	.296
† 1998 Patriot League tournament winner

The 1997–98 Navy Midshipmen men's basketball team represented the United States Naval Academy during the 1997–98 NCAA Division I men's basketball season. The Midshipmen were led by second-year head coach Don DeVoe, and played their home games at Alumni Hall in Annapolis, Maryland as members of the Patriot League.

== Roster ==
1997–98 Navy Midshipmen men's basketball team
Players	Coaches
Pos. / # / Name / Height / Weight / Year / Previous school / Hometown; G/F / 35 / Hassan Booker / 6 ft 3 in (1.91 m) / — / Sr / University HS / Los Angeles, California	Head coach: Don DeVoe; Assistant coach(es) Legend: (C) Team captain; (S) Suspended; (I) Ineligible; (W) Walk-on; Injured; Current redshirt

== Schedule and results ==
Date time, TV	Rank^{#}	Opponent^{#}	Result	Record	Site (attendance) city, state
Regular season
Nov 17, 1997*		at Wake Forest	L 43–67	0–1	Lawrence Joel Veterans Memorial Coliseum; Winston-Salem, North Carolina
Dec 1, 1997*		Wofford	W 80–64	3–2	Alumni Hall; Annapolis, Maryland
Dec 18, 1997*		at Pittsburgh	L 63–65	3–5	Fitzgerald Field House; Pittsburgh, Pennsylvania
Dec 20, 1997*		Gettysburg	W 74–44	4–5	Alumni Hall; Annapolis, Maryland
Dec 22, 1997*		at Harvard	W 80–65	5–5	Lavietes Pavilion; Cambridge, Massachusetts
Dec 30, 1997*		at Auburn	L 54–70	5–6	Beard–Eaves–Memorial Coliseum; Auburn, Alabama
Jan 7, 1998		Army	W 66–40	6–6 (1–0)	Alumni Hall; Annapolis, Maryland
Jan 10, 1998		Colgate	W 80–52	7–6 (2–0)	Alumni Hall; Annapolis, Maryland
Jan 12, 1998*		at William & Mary	L 68–83	7–7	William & Mary Hall; Williamsburg, Virginia
Jan 21, 1998; 7:30 p.m.		Bucknell	W 67–56		Alumni Hall; Annapolis, Maryland
Feb 14, 1998; 3:15 p.m.		at Bucknell	L 60–88		Davis Gym; Lewisburg, Pennsylvania
Patriot League tournament
Feb 28, 1998*		Army; Quarterfinals	W 79–52	17–10	Alumni Hall; Annapolis, Maryland
Mar 1, 1998*; 1:30 p.m.		Bucknell; Semifinals	W 80–61	18–10	Alumni Hall; Annapolis, Maryland
Mar 5, 1998*		Lafayette; Championship game	W 93–85	19–10	Alumni Hall; Annapolis, Maryland
NCAA tournament
Mar 12, 1998*	(16 E)	vs. (1 E) No. 1 North Carolina; First round	L 52–88	19–11	Hartford Civic Center; Hartford, Connecticut
*Non-conference game. ^{#}Rankings from AP Poll. (#) Tournament seedings in parentheses. E=East. All times are in Eastern Time.
