= 1978–79 Alabama Crimson Tide men's basketball team =

American college basketball season

1978–79 Alabama Crimson Tide men's basketball

NIT, Semifinals
- Conference: Southeastern Conference
- Record: 22–11 (11–7 SEC)
- Head coach: C. M. Newton (10th season)
- Assistant coaches: John Bostick; Wendell Hudson; Wimp Sanderson
- Home arena: Coleman Coliseum

1978–79 Southeastern Conference men's basketball standings
	Conf.				Overall
Team	W		L	PCT	W		L	PCT
No. 7 LSU	14	–	4	.778	23	–	6	.793
Tennessee †	12	–	6	.667	21	–	12	.636
Vanderbilt	11	–	7	.611	18	–	9	.667
Alabama	11	–	7	.611	22	–	11	.667
Mississippi State	11	–	7	.611	19	–	9	.679
Kentucky	10	–	8	.556	19	–	12	.613
Georgia	7	–	11	.389	14	–	14	.500
Ole Miss	6	–	12	.333	11	–	16	.407
Auburn	5	–	13	.278	13	–	16	.448
Florida	3	–	15	.167	8	–	19	.296
† 1979 SEC tournament winner Rankings from AP poll

The 1978–79 Alabama Crimson Tide men's basketball team represented the University of Alabama in the 1978–79 NCAA Division I men's basketball season. The team's head coach was C.M. Newton, who was in his eleventh season at Alabama. The team played their home games at Coleman Coliseum in Tuscaloosa, Alabama. They finished the season 22–11, 11–7 in SEC play.

The Tide reached the second round of the inaugural 1979 SEC men's basketball tournament, where they lost to Kentucky 100–101. Afterwards, the Tide accepted a bid to the 1979 National Invitation Tournament and reached the semi-final where they lost to Purdue University.

== Roster ==
1978–79 Alabama Crimson Tide men's basketball team
Players
Coaches

Pos.	#	Name	Height	Weight	Year	Previous school	Hometown
G	10	Robert Scott	6 ft 1 in (1.85 m)	165 lb (75 kg)	So	A. H. Parker High School	Birmingham, AL
G	14	Leroy Russell	6 ft 2 in (1.88 m)	180 lb (82 kg)	Sr	—	Brent, AL
G	20	Eddie Adams	5 ft 11 in (1.8 m)	165 lb (75 kg)	Fr	Central High School	Phenix City, AL
G	22	Reggie Strickland	6 ft 2 in (1.88 m)	165 lb (75 kg)	So	—	Opelika, AL
F	32	Ken Johnson	6 ft 7 in (2.01 m)	200 lb (91 kg)	Fr	Central High School	Phenix City, AL
F	40	Maurice Myers	6 ft 8 in (2.03 m)	210 lb (95 kg)	Fr	Holy Family High School	Birmingham, AL
G	41	Joe Hancock	6 ft 5 in (1.96 m)	195 lb (88 kg)	Jr	—	Tarrant, AL
F	43	Carl Mitchell	6 ft 7 in (2.01 m)	195 lb (88 kg)	Fr	—	Dothan, AL
G	44	Greg McElveen	6 ft 4 in (1.93 m)	190 lb (86 kg)	Sr	—	Baton Rouge, LA
F	45	Richie Hood	6 ft 6 in (1.98 m)	220 lb (100 kg)	Sr	—	Millport, AL
C	50	Phillip Lockett	6 ft 9 in (2.06 m)	200 lb (91 kg)	Fr	Livingston High School	Livingston, AL
F	51	Eddie Phillips	6 ft 6 in (1.98 m)	220 lb (100 kg)	Fr	A. H. Parker High School	Birmingham, AL
F	52	Reggie King	6 ft 6 in (1.98 m)	225 lb (102 kg)	Sr	Jackson Olin High School	Birmingham, AL

Head coach

- C.M. Newton

Assistant coach(es)

- John Bostick
- Wendell Hudson
- Wimp Sanderson

Legend

- (C) Team captain
- (S) Suspended
- (I) Ineligible
- (W) Walk-on
- Injured
- Current redshirt
