= Don DeVoe =

American basketball coach (born 1941)

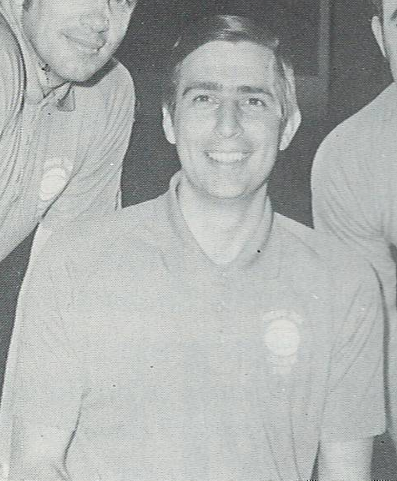
- DeVoe, c. 1972

Biographical details
- Born: December 31, 1941 (age 84); Sabina, Ohio, U.S.

Playing career
- 1962–1964: Ohio State

Coaching career (HC unless noted)
- 1965–1970: Army (assistant)
- 1970–1971: Ohio State (GA)
- 1971–1976: Virginia Tech
- 1976–1978: Wyoming
- 1978–1989: Tennessee
- 1989–1990: Florida
- 1992–2004: Navy

Head coaching record
- Overall: 512–389
- Tournaments: 5–9 (NCAA Division I); 10–3 (NIT)

Accomplishments and honors

Championships
- NIT (1973); SEC tournament (1979); SEC regular season (1982); 5 Patriot League regular season (1994, 1996–1998, 2000); 3 Patriot League tournament (1994, 1997, 1998)

Awards
- 3× SEC Coach of the Year (1979, 1981, 1982); 3× Patriot League Coach of the Year (1994, 1997, 2000)

Donald Eugene DeVoe (born December 31, 1941) is an American former college basketball coach and former player. DeVoe played college basketball for Ohio State University, and later served as the head coach for Virginia Tech, the University of Wyoming, the University of Tennessee, the University of Florida and the United States Naval Academy.

== Early life and playing career ==
Born in Sabina, Ohio, DeVoe grew up in the small town of Port William, Ohio. He attended Ohio State University in Columbus, Ohio, where he played for coach Fred Taylor's Ohio State Buckeyes from 1962 to 1964. He was a member of the 1962 Buckeyes team that lost to the Cincinnati Bearcats in the final game of the NCAA Tournament, as well as the Buckeyes' Big Ten Conference champion teams of 1963 and 1964.

== Coaching career ==
DeVoe's Buckeyes teammates included Bob Knight, under whom he served as an assistant coach, from 1965 to 1970, while Knight led the Army Black Knights men's basketball team. At that time, DeVoe served as a graduate assistant at Ohio State University for the 1970–71 season. After a season with Ohio State, DeVoe became the head coach for Virginia Tech.

While coaching the Virginia Tech Hokies men's basketball team, DeVoe led the Hokies to a National Invitational Tournament (NIT) title in 1973, as well as an NCAA tournament appearance in 1976. Playing an independent schedule, DeVoe's Hokies compiled an 88–45 record in five seasons from 1971 to 1976. From 1976 to 1978, DeVoe led the Wyoming Cowboys basketball program.

From 1978 to 1989, DeVoe was the head coach of the Tennessee Volunteers men's basketball team. In eleven seasons in Knoxville, he compiled a 204–137 record. DeVoe's Volunteers teams emphasized hustle, team play and man-to-man defense. He led the Volunteers to an SEC tournament title in 1979, their first ever NCAA Tournament Sweet Sixteen appearance in 1981, where they lost to top-seeded Virginia Cavaliers. In his final season at Tennessee in 1988–89, he led the Vols to a 19–11 record and an NCAA Tournament appearance.

In the aftermath of NCAA infractions that led the University of Florida to demand head coach Norm Sloan's resignation before the start of the 1989–90 season, DeVoe became the interim head coach of the Florida Gators men's basketball team shortly after retiring as head coach of Tennessee. The Gators were a talented team beset by personality problems, and DeVoe later described his acceptance of the job on an interim basis as a "mistake" that left him without authority to fix the program's more serious issues. He publicly clashed with the Gators' temperamental star center Dwayne Schintzius when DeVoe attempted to impose a new conditioning program and a measure of team discipline. Schintzius quit mid-season, ostensibly over DeVoe's demand that he get a haircut, and the Gators finished 7–21 overall and 3–15 in the SEC. After he was let go by Florida, he was succeeded by Lon Kruger.

DeVoe served as the head coach of the Navy Midshipmen men's basketball team from 1992 to 2004. He led the Midshipmen to a 182–155 record, a 26–3 record against arch-rival Army, five Patriot League regular season titles, three Patriot League tournament titles, and three NCAA Tournament appearances in twelve seasons. DeVoe was named Patriot League Coach of the Year three times.

In his thirty-one season career as a college basketball head coach, DeVoe led three different teams to the NCAA tournament, and posted an overall win–loss record of 512–389 (.568).

== Personal ==
DeVoe and his wife Ana have three children: Donna Lee, Elliott and AnaLise. He is currently a member of the NIT selection committee.

== Head coaching record ==
Record table
Season	Team	Overall	Conference	Standing	Postseason
Virginia Tech Gobblers (NCAA University Division / Division I independent) (1971–1976)
1971–72	Virginia Tech	16–10			
1972–73	Virginia Tech	22–5			NIT champion
1973–74	Virginia Tech	13–13			
1974–75	Virginia Tech	16–10			
1975–76	Virginia Tech	21–7			NCAA Division I First Round
Virginia Tech:		88–45			
Wyoming Cowboys (Western Athletic Conference) (1976–1978)
1976–77	Wyoming	17–10	8–6	T–3rd	
1977–78	Wyoming	12–15	3–11	7th	
Wyoming:		29–25	11–17		
Tennessee Volunteers (Southeastern Conference) (1978–1989)
1978–79	Tennessee	21–12	12–6	2nd	NCAA Division I Second Round
1979–80	Tennessee	18–11	12–6	T–3rd	NCAA Division I Second Round
1980–81	Tennessee	21–8	12–6	3rd	NCAA Division I Sweet 16
1981–82	Tennessee	20–10	13–5	T–1st	NCAA Division I Second Round
1982–83	Tennessee	20–12	9–9	T–4th	NCAA Division I Second Round
1983–84	Tennessee	21–14	9–9	6th	NIT Quarterfinal
1984–85	Tennessee	22–15	8–10	T–8th	NIT Third Place
1985–86	Tennessee	12–16	5–13	8th	
1986–87	Tennessee	14–15	7–11	T–9th	
1987–88	Tennessee	16–13	9–9	6th	NIT First Round
1988–89	Tennessee	19–11	11–7	T–4th	NCAA Division I First Round
Tennessee:		204–137	107–91		
Florida Gators (Southeastern Conference) (1989–1990)
1989–90	Florida	7–21	3–15	10th	
Florida:		7–21	3–15		
Navy Midshipmen (Patriot League) (1992–2004)
1992–93	Navy	8–19	5–9	5th	
1993–94	Navy	17–13	9–5	T–1st	NCAA Division I First Round
1994–95	Navy	20–9	10–4	3rd	
1995–96	Navy	15–12	9–3	T–1st	
1996–97	Navy	20–9	10–2	1st	NCAA Division I First Round
1997–98	Navy	19–11	10–2	T–1st	NCAA Division I First Round
1998–99	Navy	20–7	9–3	2nd	
1999–00	Navy	23–6	11–1	T–1st	
2000–01	Navy	19–12	9–3	2nd	
2001–02	Navy	10–20	5–9	7th	
2002–03	Navy	8–20	4–10	7th	
2003–04	Navy	5–23	2–12	8th	
Navy:		184–161	93–63		
Total:		512–389			
National champion Postseason invitational champion Conference regular season champion Conference regular season and conference tournament champion Division regular season champion Division regular season and conference tournament champion Conference tournament champion

== Bibliography ==
- Dortch, Chris, String Music: Inside the Rise of SEC Basketball, Brassey's, Inc., Dulles, Virginia (2002). ISBN 1-57488-439-5.
- Koss, Bill, Pond Birds: Gator Basketball, The Whole Story From The Inside, Fast Break Press, Gainesville, Florida (1996). ISBN 978-0-8130-1523-1.
