= 1978–79 LSU Tigers basketball team =

American college basketball season

1978–79 LSU Tigers basketball

SEC regular season champions

NCAA tournament, Sweet Sixteen
- Conference: Southeastern Conference

Ranking
- Coaches: No. 9
- AP: No. 7
- Record: 23–6 (14–4 SEC)
- Head coach: Dale Brown (7th season)
- Assistant coach: Ron Abernathy (3rd season)
- Home arena: LSU Assembly Center

1978–79 Southeastern Conference men's basketball standings
	Conf.				Overall
Team	W		L	PCT	W		L	PCT
No. 7 LSU	14	–	4	.778	23	–	6	.793
Tennessee †	12	–	6	.667	21	–	12	.636
Vanderbilt	11	–	7	.611	18	–	9	.667
Alabama	11	–	7	.611	22	–	11	.667
Mississippi State	11	–	7	.611	19	–	9	.679
Kentucky	10	–	8	.556	19	–	12	.613
Georgia	7	–	11	.389	14	–	14	.500
Ole Miss	6	–	12	.333	11	–	16	.407
Auburn	5	–	13	.278	13	–	16	.448
Florida	3	–	15	.167	8	–	19	.296
† 1979 SEC tournament winner Rankings from AP poll

The 1978–79 LSU Tigers men's basketball team represented Louisiana State University during the 1978–79 NCAA men's college basketball season. The head coach was Dale Brown. The team was a member of the Southeastern Conference and played their home games at the LSU Assembly Center.

== Roster ==
1978–79 LSU Tigers men's basketball team
Players
Coaches

Pos.	#	Name	Height	Weight	Year	Hometown
G	11	Al Green	6 ft 2 in (1.88 m)	170 lb (77 kg)	Sr	Pittsfield, Massachusetts
G	22	Brian Bergeron	6 ft 3 in (1.91 m)	175 lb (79 kg)	Fr	Port Allen, Louisiana
C	44	Andy Campbell	7 ft 2 in (2.18 m)	235 lb (107 kg)	So	Hackham West, South Australia
C	43	Greg Cook	6 ft 9 in (2.06 m)	230 lb (104 kg)	So	Roselle, New Jersey
F	40	Durand Macklin	6 ft 7 in (2.01 m)	205 lb (93 kg)	So	Louisville, Kentucky
G	21	Ethan Martin	6 ft 0 in (1.83 m)	170 lb (77 kg)	So	Baton Rouge, Louisiana
F	31	DeWayne Scales	6 ft 8 in (2.03 m)	205 lb (93 kg)	So	Dallas, Texas
G	10	Willie Sims	6 ft 3 in (1.91 m)	200 lb (91 kg)	So	Long Island City, New York

Head coach

- Dale Brown

Assistant coach(es)

- Ron Abernathy

Legend

- (C) Team captain
- (S) Suspended
- (I) Ineligible
- (W) Walk-on
- Injured
- Current redshirt

Roster

== Schedule and results ==
Date time, TV	Rank^{#}	Opponent^{#}	Result	Record	Site city, state
Regular season
Nov 24, 1978*	No. 14	Saint Francis (PA)	W 112–81	1–0	LSU Assembly Center; Baton Rouge, Louisiana
Nov 27, 1978*	No. 11	at New Orleans	W 64–42	2–0	Human Performance Center; New Orleans, Louisiana
Dec 1, 1978*	No. 11	Oral Roberts	W 91–75	3–0	LSU Assembly Center; Baton Rouge, Louisiana
Dec 4, 1978*	No. 11	Tulane	W 109–85	4–0	LSU Assembly Center; Baton Rouge, Louisiana
Dec 9, 1978*	No. 12	at Tulane	W 98–88	5–0	Louisiana Superdome; New Orleans, Louisiana
Dec 18, 1978*	No. 11	Montana State	W 99–89	6–0	LSU Assembly Center; Baton Rouge, Louisiana
Dec 21, 1978*	No. 10	at Army	W 83–77	7–0	Madison Square Garden; New York, New York
Dec 29, 1978*	No. 7	Colgate	W 100–73	8–0	LSU Assembly Center; Baton Rouge, Louisiana
Jan 3, 1979	No. 7	Georgia	W 97–75	9–0 (1–0)	LSU Assembly Center; Baton Rouge, Louisiana
Jan 6, 1979	No. 7	at No. 9 Kentucky	W 93–89	10–0 (2–0)	Rupp Arena; Lexington, Kentucky
Jan 8, 1979	No. 5	at Vanderbilt	L 87–88	10–1 (2–1)	Memorial Gymnasium; Nashville, Tennessee
Jan 10, 1979		at Alabama	L 76–90	10–2 (2–2)	Coleman Coliseum; Tuscaloosa, Alabama
Jan 13, 1979		Florida	W 80–72	11–2 (3–2)	LSU Assembly Center; Baton Rouge, Louisiana
Feb 22, 1979	No. 5	Alabama	W 86–66	22–3 (14–3)	LSU Assembly Center; Baton Rouge, Louisiana
Feb 24, 1979	No. 5	Mississippi State	L 57–65	22–4 (14–4)	LSU Assembly Center; Baton Rouge, Louisiana
SEC tournament
Mar 2, 1979*; Chesley-TPC	(1) No. 8	vs. (6) Kentucky; Semifinals	L 67–80	22–5	Birmingham-Jefferson Civic Center; Birmingham, Alabama
NCAA tournament
Mar 10, 1979*	(3 ME)	vs. (6 ME) Appalachian State; Second round	W 71–57	23–5	Assembly Hall; Bloomington, Indiana
Mar 16, 1979*	(3 ME)	vs. (2 ME) No. 3 Michigan State; Mideast Regional Final – Sweet Sixteen	L 71–87	23–6	Market Square Arena; Indianapolis, Indiana
*Non-conference game. ^{#}Rankings from AP Poll. (#) Tournament seedings in parentheses. ME=Mideast.
