= 1978–79 Auburn Tigers men's basketball team =

American college basketball season

1978–79 Auburn Tigers men's basketball

Big Sun Tournament champions
- Conference: Southeastern Conference
- Record: 13–16 (5–13 SEC)
- Head coach: Sonny Smith (1st season)
- Assistant coaches: Herbert Greene; Mack McCarthy; Herman Williams
- Captains: Bubba Price; Rich Valavicius
- Home arena: Memorial Coliseum

1978–79 Southeastern Conference men's basketball standings
| | Conf. | | | | Overall |
| Team | W | | L | PCT | W | | L | PCT |
|---|---|---|---|---|---|---|---|---|
| No. 7 LSU | 14 | – | 4 | .778 | 23 | – | 6 | .793 |
| Tennessee † | 12 | – | 6 | .667 | 21 | – | 12 | .636 |
| Vanderbilt | 11 | – | 7 | .611 | 18 | – | 9 | .667 |
| Alabama | 11 | – | 7 | .611 | 22 | – | 11 | .667 |
| Mississippi State | 11 | – | 7 | .611 | 19 | – | 9 | .679 |
| Kentucky | 10 | – | 8 | .556 | 19 | – | 12 | .613 |
| Georgia | 7 | – | 11 | .389 | 14 | – | 14 | .500 |
| Ole Miss | 6 | – | 12 | .333 | 11 | – | 16 | .407 |
| Auburn | 5 | – | 13 | .278 | 13 | – | 16 | .448 |
| Florida | 3 | – | 15 | .167 | 8 | – | 19 | .296 |
† 1979 SEC tournament winner Rankings from AP poll

The 1978–79 Auburn Tigers men's basketball team represented Auburn University in the 1978–79 college basketball season.

Auburn began the year with newly-hired Paul Lambert as head coach, but Lambert died in a hotel fire in Columbus, Georgia on June 6, 1978 before ever coaching a game. Sonny Smith from East Tennessee State was hired as coach.

The team played their home games at Memorial Coliseum in Auburn, Alabama. They finished the season 13–16, 5–13 in SEC play. They defeated Vanderbilt and Georgia to advance to the semifinals of the SEC tournament where they lost to Tennessee.

== Roster ==
1978–79 Auburn Tigers men's basketball team
Players
Coaches

| Pos. | # | Name | Height | Weight | Year | Previous school | Hometown |
|---|---|---|---|---|---|---|---|
| G | 3 | Taylor Hart | 6 ft 2 in (1.88 m) | 180 lb (82 kg) | Fr | Eufaula High School | Eufaula, AL |
| G | 4 | Lewis Card | 6 ft 3 in (1.91 m) | 195 lb (88 kg) | Fr | Auburn High School | Auburn, AL |
| G | 11 | Mark Barnhizer | 6 ft 2 in (1.88 m) | 190 lb (86 kg) | Sr | Lapel High School | Lapel, IN |
| F | 14 | Roy McGrew | 6 ft 5 in (1.96 m) | 185 lb (84 kg) | Fr | Fairfield High School | Fairfield, AL |
| G | 21 | Bubba Price | 6 ft 3 in (1.91 m) | 175 lb (79 kg) | Jr | Carver High School | Birmingham, AL |
| G | 22 | Eric Stringer | 6 ft 1 in (1.85 m) | 185 lb (84 kg) | Jr | Oxford High School | Hobson City, AL |
| G | 25 | Kirk Powers | 6 ft 0 in (1.83 m) | 178 lb (81 kg) | Sr | Auburn High School | Auburn, AL |
| F | 41 | Benny Anthony | 6 ft 7 in (2.01 m) | 215 lb (98 kg) | Jr | Bainbridge High School | Bainbridge, GA |
| F | 42 | Rich Valavicius | 6 ft 5 in (1.96 m) | 220 lb (100 kg) | Jr | Hammond High School | Hammond, IN |
| F | 44 | Earl Banks | 6 ft 7 in (2.01 m) | 220 lb (100 kg) | So | Holy Family High School | Birmingham, AL |
| C | 45 | Bobby Cattage | 6 ft 9 in (2.06 m) | 250 lb (113 kg) | So | J.O. Johnson High School | Huntsville, AL |
| C | 54 | Jeff Adams | 6 ft 9 in (2.06 m) | 240 lb (109 kg) | Sr | Lake Weir High School | Weirsville, AL |

Head coach

- Sonny Smith

Assistant coach(es)

- Herbert Greene
- Mack McCarthy
- Herman Williams

Legend

- (C) Team captain
- (S) Suspended
- (I) Ineligible
- (W) Walk-on
- Injured
- Current redshirt
