= 1978–79 Tennessee Volunteers basketball team =

American college basketball season

1978–79 Tennessee Volunteers basketball

SEC tournament champions

NCAA tournament, Second round
- Conference: Southeastern Conference
- East
- Record: 21–12 (12–6 SEC)
- Head coach: Don DeVoe (1st season)
- Home arena: Stokely Athletic Center

1978–79 Southeastern Conference men's basketball standings
	Conf.				Overall
Team	W		L	PCT	W		L	PCT
No. 7 LSU	14	–	4	.778	23	–	6	.793
Tennessee †	12	–	6	.667	21	–	12	.636
Vanderbilt	11	–	7	.611	18	–	9	.667
Alabama	11	–	7	.611	22	–	11	.667
Mississippi State	11	–	7	.611	19	–	9	.679
Kentucky	10	–	8	.556	19	–	12	.613
Georgia	7	–	11	.389	14	–	14	.500
Ole Miss	6	–	12	.333	11	–	16	.407
Auburn	5	–	13	.278	13	–	16	.448
Florida	3	–	15	.167	8	–	19	.296
† 1979 SEC tournament winner Rankings from AP poll

The 1978–79 Tennessee Volunteers basketball team represented the University of Tennessee as a member of the Southeastern Conference during the 1978–79 college basketball season. Led by first-year head coach Don DeVoe, the team played their home games at the Stokely Athletic Center in Knoxville, Tennessee. The Volunteers finished with a record of 21–12 (12–6 SEC, 2nd) and, after winning the SEC tournament, received an automatic bid to the 1979 NCAA tournament as the 8 seed in the Mideast region. After an opening round win over Eastern Kentucky, Tennessee was defeated by No. 1 seed Notre Dame.

This was the first of five straight seasons of NCAA Tournament basketball for the Tennessee men's program.

== Roster ==
1978–79 Tennessee Volunteers men's basketball team
Players	Coaches
Pos. / # / Name / Height / Weight / Year / Hometown; F/C / 32 / Reggie Johnson / 6 ft 9 in (2.06 m) / 200 lb (91 kg) / Jr / Atlanta, Georgia	Head coach: Don DeVoe (Ohio State); Assistant coach(es) Legend: (C) Team captain; (S) Suspended; (I) Ineligible; (W) Walk-on; Injured; Current redshirt; Roster

== Schedule and results ==
Date time, TV	Rank^{#}	Opponent^{#}	Result	Record	Site (attendance) city, state
Regular season
Dec 2, 1978*		at No. 5 Louisville	L 61–82	0–1	Freedom Hall; Louisville, Kentucky
Dec 5, 1978*		East Carolina	W 89–71	1–1	Stokely Center; Knoxville, Tennessee
Dec 9, 1978*		Ohio State	L 78–86	1–2	Stokely Center; Knoxville, Tennessee
Dec 15, 1978*		Niagara	W 100–80	2–2	Stokely Center
Dec 16, 1978*		Xavier	L 50–51	2–3	Stokely Center
Dec 22, 1978*		vs. San Jose State	W 73–68	3–3	Toso Pavilion
Dec 23, 1978*		vs. Seton Hall	W 94–80	4–3	Toso Pavilion
Dec 27, 1978*		vs. Utah; Rainbow Classic	L 71–80	4–4	Neal S. Blaisdell Center; Honolulu, Hawaii
Dec 28, 1978*		vs. Fordham; Rainbow Classic	W 83–58	5–4	Neal S. Blaisdell Center; Honolulu, Hawaii
Dec 30, 1978*		vs. Boston College; Rainbow Classic	L 72–74	5–5	Neal S. Blaisdell Center; Honolulu, Hawaii
Jan 3, 1979		at Ole Miss	W 72–67	6–5 (1–0)	Tad Smith Coliseum; Oxford, Mississippi
Feb 24, 1979		at Auburn	W 60–55	18–11 (12–6)	Memorial Coliseum; Auburn, Alabama
SEC tournament
Mar 2, 1979*; Chesley-TPC		vs. Auburn; Semifinals	W 75–64	19–11	BJCC Coliseum; Birmingham, Alabama
Mar 3, 1979*; Chesley-TPC		vs. Kentucky; Championship game	W 75–69 ^{OT}	20–11	BJCC Coliseum; Birmingham, Alabama
NCAA tournament
Mar 9, 1979*	(8 ME) No. 20	vs. (9 ME) Eastern Kentucky; First round	W 97–81	20–11	Murphy Center; Murfreesboro, Tennessee
Mar 11, 1979*	(8 ME) No. 20	vs. (1 ME) No. 5 Notre Dame; Second round	L 67–73	20–12	Murphy Center (10,982); Murfreesboro, Tennessee
*Non-conference game. ^{#}Rankings from AP poll. (#) Tournament seedings in parentheses. ME=Mideast. All times are in Eastern Time.

== NBA draft ==
Round	Pick	Player	NBA club
3	62	Terry Crosby	Kansas City Kings
