= Pete Herrmann =

American retired basketball coach

Biographical details
- Born: August 27, 1948 (age 78)

Coaching career (HC unless noted)
- 1970–1974: Byron-Bergen HS (assistant)
- 1974–1975: Hobart (assistant)
- 1975–1980: Midlakes HS
- 1980–1986: Navy (assistant)
- 1986–1992: Navy
- 1992–1994: Kansas State (assistant)
- 1994–1998: Virginia (assistant)
- 1998–2003: Western Kentucky (assistant)
- 2003–2009: Georgia (assistant)
- 2009: Georgia (interim HC)
- 2010–2018: Young Harris

Head coaching record
- Overall: 180–221 (college)
- Tournaments: 0–1 (NCAA Division I)

Accomplishments and honors

Championships
- CAA regular season (1987); CAA tournament (1987)

Pete Herrmann (born August 27, 1948) is an American former basketball coach. He served as the head basketball coach at the United States Naval Academy from 1986 to 1992 and Young Harris College from 2010 to 2018. He was also the interim head men's basketball coach at the University of Georgia for the final 12 games of the 2008–09 season following the firing of Dennis Felton. Herrmann restarted the basketball program at Young Harris in 2010–11 after a 40-year hiatus. At Navy he coached future National Basketball Association (NBA) All-Star and Olympian David Robinson.

== Personal life ==
Herrmann graduated from the State University of New York at Geneseo in 1970. Herrmann and his wife, Sharon, reside in Young Harris, Georgia.

== Head coaching record ==
Record table
Season	Team	Overall	Conference	Standing	Postseason
Navy Midshipmen (Colonial Athletic Association) (1986–1991)
1986–87	Navy	26–6	13–1	1st	NCAA Division I first round
1987–88	Navy	12–16	6–8	5th	
1988–89	Navy	6–22	1–13	8th	
1989–90	Navy	5–23	4–10	6th	
1990–91	Navy	8–21	2–12	8th	
Navy Midshipmen (Patriot League) (1991–1992)
1991–92	Navy	6–22	1–13	8th	
Navy:		63–110	27–57		
Georgia Bulldogs (Southeastern Conference) (2009)
2008–09	Georgia	3–9	3–9	6th (East)	
Georgia:		3–9	3–9		
Young Harris Mountain Lions (Independent) (2010–2012)
2010–11	Young Harris	5–21			
2011–12	Young Harris	22–4			
Young Harris Mountain Lions (Peach Belt Conference) (2012–2018)
2012–13	Young Harris	17–9	12–7	2nd (West)	
2013–14	Young Harris	17–9	11–8	T–2nd (West)	
2014–15	Young Harris	13–14	9–10	T–4th (West)	
2015–16	Young Harris	15–14	13–6	3rd (West)	
2016–17	Young Harris	17–11	11–8	T–1st (West)	
2017–18	Young Harris	8–20	7–15	T–9th	
Young Harris:		114–102	63–54		
Total:		180–221			
National champion Postseason invitational champion Conference regular season champion Conference regular season and conference tournament champion Division regular season champion Division regular season and conference tournament champion Conference tournament champion
