= 1986–87 Navy Midshipmen men's basketball team =

American college basketball season

1986–87 Navy Midshipmen men's basketball

CAA tournament champions CAA Regular Season Champions

NCAA men's Division I tournament, Lost First Round
- Conference: Colonial Athletic Association
- Record: 26–6 (13–1 CAA)
- Head coach: Pete Herrmann (1st season)

1986–87 CAA men's basketball standings
	Conf.				Overall
Team	W		L	PCT	W		L	PCT
Navy †	13	–	1	.929	26	–	6	.813
UNC Wilmington	9	–	5	.643	18	–	12	.600
Richmond	8	–	6	.571	15	–	14	.517
James Madison	8	–	6	.571	20	–	10	.667
George Mason	7	–	7	.500	15	–	13	.536
American	5	–	9	.357	13	–	14	.481
East Carolina	4	–	10	.286	12	–	16	.429
William & Mary	2	–	12	.143	5	–	22	.185
† 1987 CAA tournament winner Rankings from AP Poll

The 1986–87 Navy Midshipmen men's basketball team represented the United States Naval Academy during the 1986–87 NCAA Division I basketball season. The Midshipmen were led by first-year head coach Pete Herrmann and played their home games as members of the Colonial Athletic Association at Halsey Field House in Annapolis, Maryland.

== Roster ==
1986–87 Navy Midshipmen men's basketball team
Players
Coaches

Pos.	#	Name	Height	Weight	Year	Previous school	Hometown
G	10	Doug Wojcik	6 ft 1 in (1.85 m)	180 lb (82 kg)	Sr	Wheeling Central Catholic	Wheeling, West Virginia
F	40	Carl Liebert	6 ft 6 in (1.98 m)	205 lb (93 kg)	Sr		Floyds Knobs, Indiana
C	50	David Robinson	7 ft 1 in (2.16 m)	230 lb (104 kg)	Sr	Osbourn Park	Woodbridge, Virginia

Head coach

- Pete Herrmann

Assistant coach(es)

- John Fitzpatrick
- David Laton

Legend

- (C) Team captain
- (S) Suspended
- (I) Ineligible
- (W) Walk-on
- Injured
- Current redshirt

== Schedule and results ==
Date time, TV	Rank^{#}	Opponent^{#}	Result	Record	High points	High rebounds	High assists	Site (attendance) city, state
Non-conference regular season
Nov 22, 1986*	No. 9	vs. No. 17 NC State; Hall of Fame Tip-off Classic	L 84–86	0-1	36 – Robinson	10 – Robinson	–	Springfield Civic Center (8,862); Springfield, MA
Nov 28, 1986*	No. 9	vs. Utica; Spartan Cutlass Classic	W 86–55	1–1	25 – Liebert	12 – Robinson	–	Jenison Fieldhouse; East Lansing, MI
Nov 29, 1986*	No. 9	at Michigan State; Spartan Cutlass Classic	W 91–90 ^{OT}	2–1	43 – Robinson	16 – Robinson	–	Jenison Fieldhouse; East Lansing, MI
Dec 5, 1986*	No. 10	Yale	W 92–63	3–1	31 – Robinson	–	–	Halsey Field House (3,700); Annapolis, MD
Dec 8, 1986*	No. 10	Saint Leo	W 92–57	4–1	30 – Robinson	16 – Robinson	–	Halsey Field House; Annapolis, MD
Dec 27, 1986*	No. 12	vs. Idaho State; UNLV Holiday Classic	W 78–56	5–1	28 – Robinson	13 – Robinson	–	Thomas & Mack Center; Las Vegas, NV
Dec 28, 1986*	No. 12	at No. 1 UNLV; UNLV Holiday Classic	L 79–104	5–2	29 – Robinson	9 – Robinson	–	Thomas & Mack Center (20,321); Las Vegas, NV
CAA regular season
Jan 3, 1987	No. 9	UNC Wilmington	W 72–58	6–2 (1–0)	–	14 – Robinson	–	Halsey Field House; Annapolis, MD
Jan 5, 1987	No. 9	East Carolina	W 91–66	7–2 (2–0)	31 – Robinson	16 – Robinson	–	Halsey Field House; Annapolis, MD
Jan 8, 1987	No. 15	Richmond	L 62–64	7–3 (2–1)	–	–	–	Halsey Field House; Annapolis, MD
Jan 10, 1987	No. 15	at James Madison	W 95–70	8–3 (3–1)	45 – Robinson	21 – Robinson	–	JMU Convocation Center; Harrisonburg, VA
Jan 12, 1987	No. 15	at George Mason	W 59–57	9–3 (4–1)	–	–	–	Patriot Center; Fairfax, VA
Jan 15, 1987*	No. 19	at Lafayette	W 75–71 ^{2OT}	10–3	30 – Robinson	15 – Robinson	–	Kirby Sports Center; Easton, PA
Jan 17, 1987	No. 19	American	W 96–69	11–3 (5–1)	–	–	–	Halsey Field House; Annapolis, MD
Jan 19, 1987*	No. 19	Delaware	W 84–60	12–3	–	–	–	Halsey Field House; Annapolis, MD
Jan 21, 1987*	No. 18	at Drexel	L 80–83	12–4	44 – Robinson	14 – Robinson	–	Daskalakis Athletic Center; Philadelphia, PA
Jan 23, 1987	No. 18	William & Mary	W 82–59	13–4 (6–1)	25 – Robinson	–	–	Halsey Field House; Annapolis, MD
Jan 25, 1987*	No. 18	at Kentucky	L 69–80	13–5	45 – Robinson	14 – Robinson	–	Rupp Arena; Lexington, KY
Jan 31, 1987		at UNC Wilmington	W 67–66	14–5 (7–1)	–	–	–	Trask Coliseum; Wilmington, NC
Feb 2, 1987		at East Carolina	W 76–60	15–5 (8–1)	–	–	–	Williams Arena at Minges Coliseum; Greenville, NC
Feb 5, 1987		James Madison	W 73–71	16–5 (9–1)	–	–	–	Halsey Field House; Annapolis, MD
Feb 7, 1987*		vs. Miami (FL)	W 73–62	17–5	–	–	–	
Feb 9, 1987		George Mason	W 81–64	18–5 (10–1)	–	–	–	Halsey Field House; Seattle, WA
Feb 11, 1987*		Maryland-Baltimore County	W 75–50	19–5	–	–	–	Halsey Field House; Annapolis, MD
Feb 14, 1987		at American	W 68–61	20–5 (11–1)	–	–	–	Fort Myer Ceremonial Hall; Washington, D.C.
Feb 16, 1987		at William & Mary	W 63–52	21–5 (12–1)	–	–	–	Kaplan Arena; Williamsburg, VA
Feb 21, 1987*		Army	W 58–52	22–5	–	13 – Robinson	–	Halsey Field House; Annapolis, MD
Feb 24, 1987		at Richmond	W 84–66	23–5 (13–1)	23 – Robinson	11 – Robinson	–	Robins Center; Richmond, VA
CAA tournament
Feb 28, 1987*		vs. William & Mary; CAA Tournament Quarterfinal	W 63–52	24–5	26 – Robinson	13 – Robinson	–	Hampton Coliseum; Hampton, VA
Mar 1, 1987*		vs. James Madison; CAA Tournament Semifinal	W 85–64	25–5	–	–	–	Hampton Coliseum; Hampton, VA
Mar 2, 1987*		vs. UNC Wilmington; CAA tournament championship	W 53–50	26–5	23 – Robinson	–	–	Hampton Coliseum; Hampton, VA
NCAA tournament
Mar 12, 1987*	(8 E)	vs. (9 E) Michigan; First Round	L 82–97	26–6	50 – Robinson	13 – Robinson	6 – Wojcik	Charlotte Coliseum; Charlotte, NC
*Non-conference game. ^{#}Rankings from AP Poll. (#) Tournament seedings in parentheses. E=East. All times are in Eastern Time.

== Awards and honors ==
- David Robinson – Naismith College Player of the Year, USBWA College Player of the Year, John R. Wooden Award, AP Player of the Year, Adolph Rupp Trophy, NABC Player of the Year, Sporting News Player of the Year, CAA Player of the Year (3), National leader in blocked shots per game (4.5)

== Team players drafted into the NBA ==
Round	Pick	Player	NBA club
1	1	David Robinson	San Antonio Spurs
