= 1978–79 Eastern Kentucky Colonels basketball team =

American college basketball season

1978–79 Eastern Kentucky Colonels men's basketball
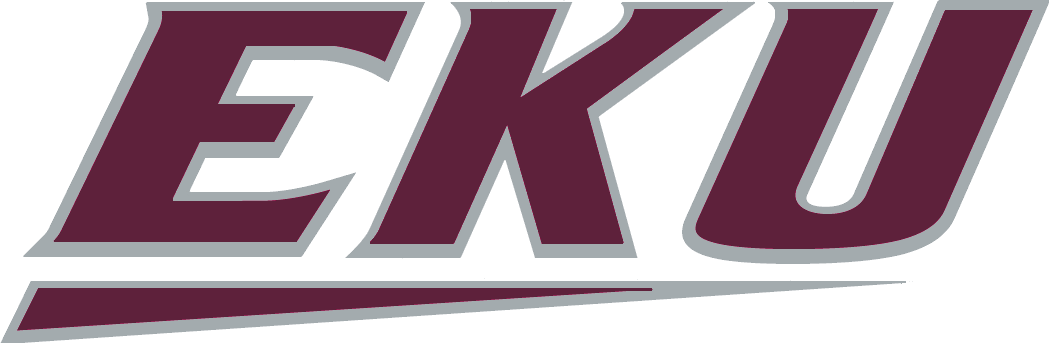

Ohio Valley tournament champions

NCAA tournament
- Conference: Ohio Valley Conference
- East Division
- Record: 21–8 (9–3 OVC)
- Head coach: Ed Byhre
- Home arena: Alumni Coliseum

1978–79 Ohio Valley Conference men's basketball standings
	Conf.				Overall
Team	W		L	PCT	W		L	PCT
Eastern Kentucky †	9	–	3	.750	21	–	8	.724
Western Kentucky	7	–	5	.583	17	–	11	.607
Morehead State	7	–	5	.583	14	–	13	.519
Middle Tennessee	7	–	5	.583	16	–	11	.593
Tennessee Tech	7	–	5	.583	11	–	15	.423
Austin Peay State	3	–	9	.250	8	–	18	.308
Murray State	2	–	10	.167	4	–	22	.154
† 1979 OVC tournament winner Rankings from AP Poll

The 1978–79 Eastern Kentucky Colonels basketball team represented Eastern Kentucky University during the 1978–79 NCAA Division I men's basketball season. The Colonels, led by second-year head coach Ed Byhre, played their home games at McBrayer Arena within Alumni Coliseum and were members of the East Division of the Ohio Valley Conference. They finished the season 21–8, 9–3 in OVC play to finish in first place. They were champions of the OVC tournament to earn an automatic bid to the NCAA tournament where they lost in the opening round to No. 8 seed Tennessee.

== Roster ==
1978–79 Eastern Kentucky Colonels men's basketball team
Players	Coaches
Pos. / # / Name / Height / Weight / Year / Hometown; F / 5 / James Tillman / 6 ft 4 in (1.93 m) / — / Jr / Washington, D.C.	Head coach: Ed Byhre; Assistant coach(es) Legend: (C) Team captain; (S) Suspended; (I) Ineligible; (W) Walk-on; Injured; Current redshirt; Roster

== Schedule and results ==
Date time, TV	Rank^{#}	Opponent^{#}	Result	Record	Site (attendance) city, state
Regular season
Nov 27, 1978*		Ball State	W 88–86	1–0	McBrayer Arena; Richmond, Kentucky
Dec 1, 1978*		at Missouri	L 81–82	1–1	Hearnes Center; Columbia, Missouri
Dec 4, 1978*		Dayton	W 72–70	2–1	McBrayer Arena; Richmond, Kentucky
Dec 9, 1978*		Butler	W 104–81	3–1	McBrayer Arena; Richmond, Kentucky
Dec 16, 1978*		at Charlotte	W 86–80	4–1	Charlotte Coliseum; Charlotte, North Carolina
Dec 20, 1978*		at Nevada	L 84–116	4–2	Centennial Coliseum; Reno, Nevada
Dec 21, 1978*		vs. Fresno State	W 84–78	5–2	Centennial Coliseum; Reno, Nevada
Jan 3, 1979*		at Toledo	L 57–82	5–3	John F. Savage Hall; Toledo, Ohio
Jan 8, 1979*		at Middle Tennessee	W 81–77	6–3	Murphy Center; Murfreesboro, Tennessee
Jan 13, 1979*		Austin Peay	W 82–73	7–3	McBrayer Arena; Richmond, Kentucky
Jan 15, 1979*		Murray State	W 73–69	8–3	McBrayer Arena; Richmond, Kentucky
Jan 20, 1979*		Tennessee Tech	W 112–84	9–3	McBrayer Arena; Richmond, Kentucky
Jan 27, 1979*		Morehead State	W 97–95	10–3	McBrayer Arena; Richmond, Kentucky
Jan 29, 1979*		at Western Kentucky	L 65–70	10–4	E. A. Diddle Arena; Bowling Green, Kentucky
Feb 3, 1979*		Middle Tennessee	W 84–83	11–4	McBrayer Arena; Richmond, Kentucky
Feb 5, 1979*		Western Kentucky	L 77–78	11–5	McBrayer Arena; Richmond, Kentucky
Feb 10, 1979*		at Austin Peay	W 69–57	12–5	Dunn Center; Clarksville, Tennessee
Feb 12, 1979*		at Murray State	W 87–76	13–5	Racer Arena; Murray, Kentucky
Feb 15, 1979*		vs. West Virginia	W 93–91	14–5	Charleston Civic Center; Charleston, West Virginia
Feb 19, 1979*		at Tennessee Tech	W 100–72	15–5	Eblen Center; Cookeville, Tennessee
Feb 24, 1979*		at Morehead State	L 91–98	15–6	Wetherby Gymnasium; Morehead, Kentucky
Ohio Valley Conference tournament
Mar 2, 1979*		Middle Tennessee; Semifinals	W 90–81	20–7	McBrayer Arena; Richmond, Kentucky
Mar 3, 1979*		Western Kentucky; Championship game	W 78–77	21–7	McBrayer Arena; Richmond, Kentucky
NCAA tournament
Mar 9, 1979*	(9 ME)	vs. (8 ME) No. 20 Tennessee; First round	L 81–97	21–8	Murphy Center; Murfreesboro, Tennessee
*Non-conference game. ^{#}Rankings from AP Poll, (#) during NCAA Tournament is seed within region. (#) Tournament seedings in parentheses. ME=Mideast. All times are in Eastern Time.
