= 1994 Patriot League men's basketball tournament =

- Classification: Division I
- Season: 1993–94
- Teams: 8
- Site: Alumni Hall; Annapolis, Maryland
- Champions: Navy (1st title)
- Winning coach: Don DeVoe (1st title)
- MVP: TJ Hall (Navy)

1993–94 Patriot League men's basketball standings
	Conf.				Overall
Team	W		L	PCT	W		L	PCT
Navy †	9	–	5	.643	17	–	13	.567
Fordham	9	–	5	.643	12	–	15	.444
Colgate	9	–	5	.643	17	–	12	.586
Holy Cross	9	–	5	.643	14	–	14	.500
Bucknell	6	–	8	.429	10	–	17	.370
Lehigh	6	–	8	.429	10	–	17	.370
Lafayette	4	–	10	.286	9	–	19	.321
Army	4	–	10	.286	7	–	20	.259
† 1994 Patriot League tournament winner

The 1994 Patriot League men's basketball tournament was played at Alumni Hall in Annapolis, Maryland after the conclusion of the 1993–94 regular season. Top seed Navy defeated #3 seed Colgate, 78–76 in the championship game, to win its first Patriot League Tournament title. The Midshipmen earned an automatic bid to the 1994 NCAA tournament as #16 seed in the West region.

== Format ==
All eight league members participated in the tournament, with teams seeded according to regular season conference record. Play began with the quarterfinal round.

== Bracket ==
Quarterfinals; March 4
1	Navy	96
8	Army	84
4	Holy Cross	96
5	Bucknell	91
3	Colgate	87
6	Lehigh	80
2	Fordham	65
7	Lafayette	83

Semifinals; March 5
1	Navy	93*
4	Holy Cross	91
3	Colgate	76
7	Lafayette	73

Championship game March 11
1	Navy	78
3	Colgate	76

* denotes overtime period
