= 1987 CAA men's basketball tournament =

- Classification: Division I
- Season: 1986–87
- Teams: 8
- Site: Hampton Coliseum; Hampton, VA
- Champions: Navy (3rd title)
- Winning coach: Paul Evans (3rd title)
- MVP: David Robinson (Navy)

1986–87 CAA men's basketball standings
	Conf.				Overall
Team	W		L	PCT	W		L	PCT
Navy †	13	–	1	.929	26	–	6	.813
UNC Wilmington	9	–	5	.643	18	–	12	.600
Richmond	8	–	6	.571	15	–	14	.517
James Madison	8	–	6	.571	20	–	10	.667
George Mason	7	–	7	.500	15	–	13	.536
American	5	–	9	.357	13	–	14	.481
East Carolina	4	–	10	.286	12	–	16	.429
William & Mary	2	–	12	.143	5	–	22	.185
† 1987 CAA tournament winner Rankings from AP Poll

The 1987 Colonial Athletic Association men's basketball tournament was held February 28–March 2, 1987 at the Hampton Coliseum in Hampton, Virginia.

Navy defeated UNC Wilmington in the championship game, 53–50, to win their third consecutive CAA/ECAC South men's basketball tournament. The Midshipmen, therefore, earned an automatic bid to the 1987 NCAA tournament.

== Bracket ==
Quarterfinals; Saturday, February 28
1	Navy	63
8	William & Mary	52
5	George Mason	64
4	James Madison	68
3	Richmond	75
6	American	62
7	East Carolina	58
2	UNC Wilmington	59

Semifinals; Sunday, March 1
1	Navy	85
4	James Madison	64
3	Richmond	63
2	UNC Wilmington	69

Championship; Monday, March 2
1	Navy	53
2	UNC Wilmington	50
