= John J. Clune =

Air force athletics director (1932–1992)

Personal information
- Born: October 29, 1932 Jersey City, New Jersey, U.S.
- Died: April 4, 1992 (aged 59)
- Listed height: 6 ft 3 in (1.91 m)
- Listed weight: 190 lb (86 kg)

Career information
- High school: St. Peter's Prep (Jersey City, New Jersey)
- College: Navy (1951–1954)
- NBA draft: 1954: 10th round, 88th overall pick
- Drafted by: New York Knicks
- Position: Guard
- Stats at Basketball Reference

Colonel John J. Clune (October 29, 1932 – April 4, 1992) was the long-time director of athletics at the United States Air Force Academy. The Clune Arena at the academy is named in his memory.

A native of Jersey City, New Jersey, Clune graduated from St. Peter's High School, where he earned all-state honors in basketball. He was a 1954 graduate of the United States Naval Academy, where he earned All-American honors in basketball, and held scoring records that lasted for 30 years. He earned a master's degree in electrical engineering from the University of Southern California, completed the Armed Forces Staff College in 1959 and the Industrial College of the Armed Forces in 1972.

His initial assignments were in missile operations, missile maintenance and administration. He served as an Air Officer Commanding at the Air Force Academy from 1965 to 1968. Prior to returning the academy, he was chief of the Electronics and Equipment Division, Air Force Logistics Command and Chief of the Logistics Engineering Branch, Headquarters U.S. Air Force.

In 1975 he was appointed Director of Athletics at the Air Force Academy. During his tenure as the Air Force Academy athletic director, he arranged for the academy to become a member of the Western Athletic Conference, the first service academy to join a conference. He was responsible for initiating a 10-sport intercollegiate program for women when the first class was admitted in 1976. Once joining the WAC, Col. Clune served on the compliance committee, finance committee and the extra events committee. Clune served as president of the National Association of Collegiate Directors of Athletics and as a member of the NCAA's Postseason Football Committee. He is the former chairman of the board of directors of the College Football Association and served as chair of the NCAA Voting Committee.

He was also instrumental in working with Colorado Springs civic leaders in bringing the United States Olympic Training Center, Olympic House and two Olympic Sports Festivals to Colorado Springs. He served as the president of the Air Force Academy Athletic Association and was one of the 10 board members designated by Congress to serve on the Academy Board, which is the governing body of the Air Force Academy. While in the military, Clune was rated as a senior missileman. Among his military decorations the Legion of Merit, two Meritorious Service Medals and the Air Force Commendation Medal.

Clune was married to Pat Clune and had children.

Clune died of cancer in 1992 after serving 16 years as the athletic director at the Air Force Academy. In honor of his longtime service to Air Force athletics, the basketball arena within the Cadet Field House at USAFA was renamed Clune Arena.

== Honors ==
In 1995 Clune was inducted into the Colorado Sports Hall of Fame, where he was recognized as "the most important man in the history of Air Force Academy athletics".

In 2003 the National Football Foundation honored Clune with the John L. Toner Award, in recognition of his work developing athletics at the Academy and in the Colorado Springs area.
