= Cadet Field House =

Sports complex in Colorado, US

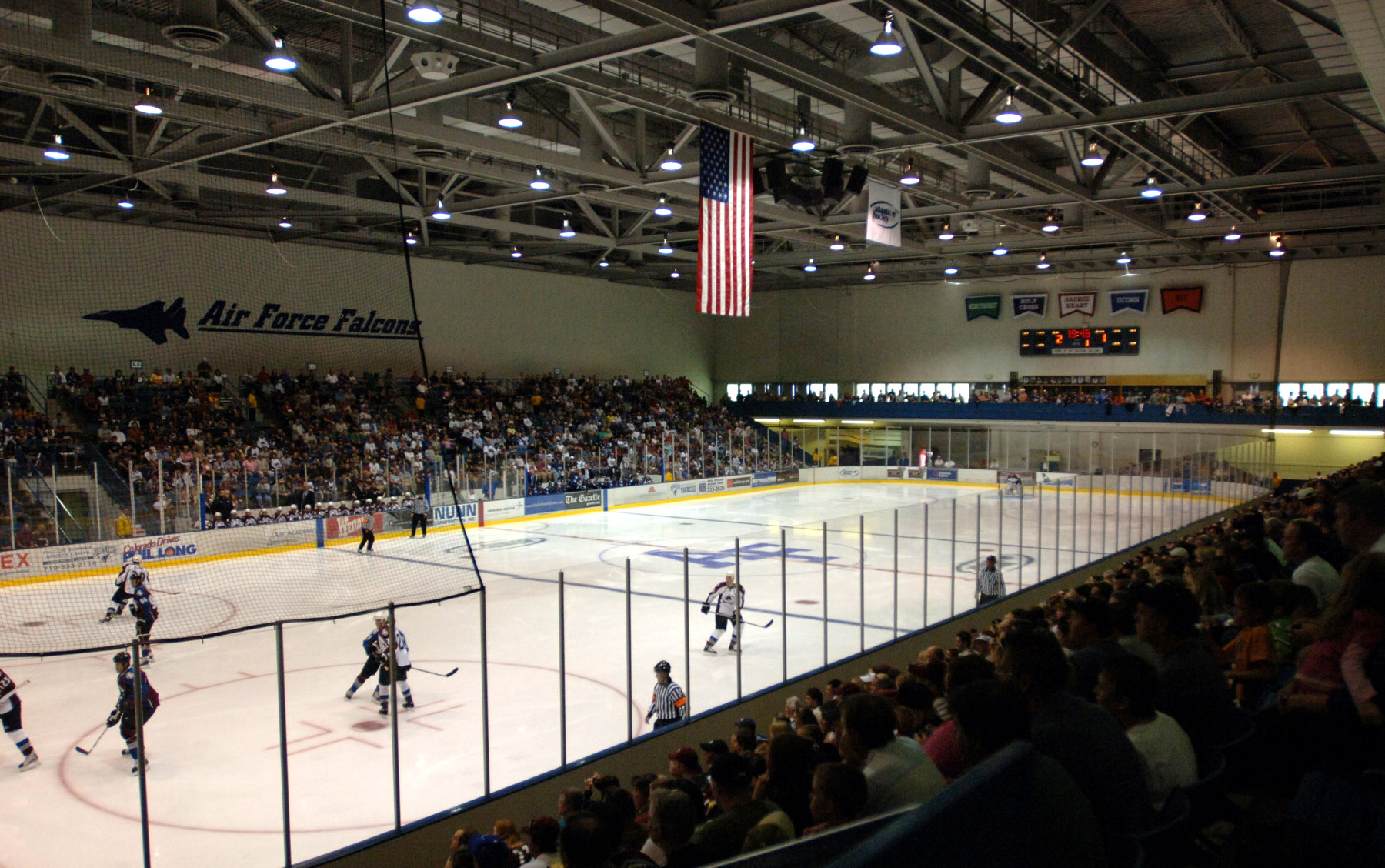
- Cadet Ice Arena within the Cadet Field House

- Location in the United States Location in Colorado
- Interactive map of Cadet Field House
- Address: 2168 Field House Drive
- Location: U.S. Air Force Academy; Colorado, U.S. near Colorado Springs
- Coordinates: 39.014°N 104.8833°W
- Owner: U.S. Air Force Academy
- Operator: U.S. Air Force Academy
- Main venue: Clune Arena; Capacity: 5,508
- Facilities: Cadet Ice Arena; Indoor track; Playing field; Training room

Construction
- Opened: 1968; 58 years ago
- Cost: $5.6 million ($51.8 million in 2025)

The Cadet Field House is an indoor sports complex in the western United States, located at the U.S. Air Force Academy in Colorado, near Colorado Springs. The multi-purpose facility was built 58 years ago in 1968, and is at an approximate elevation of 7,080 feet (2,160 m) above sea level.

== Facilities ==
The Cadet Field House has several different facilities.

- Clune Arena, a 5,508-seat basketball arena
- Cadet Ice Arena, a 2,217-seat ice hockey rink
- A 293-yard (268 m) six-lane indoor track with seating for 925 spectators
- An AstroTurf playing field, 97 yards (89 m) in length
- A 2,309-square-foot (215 m^{2}) training room

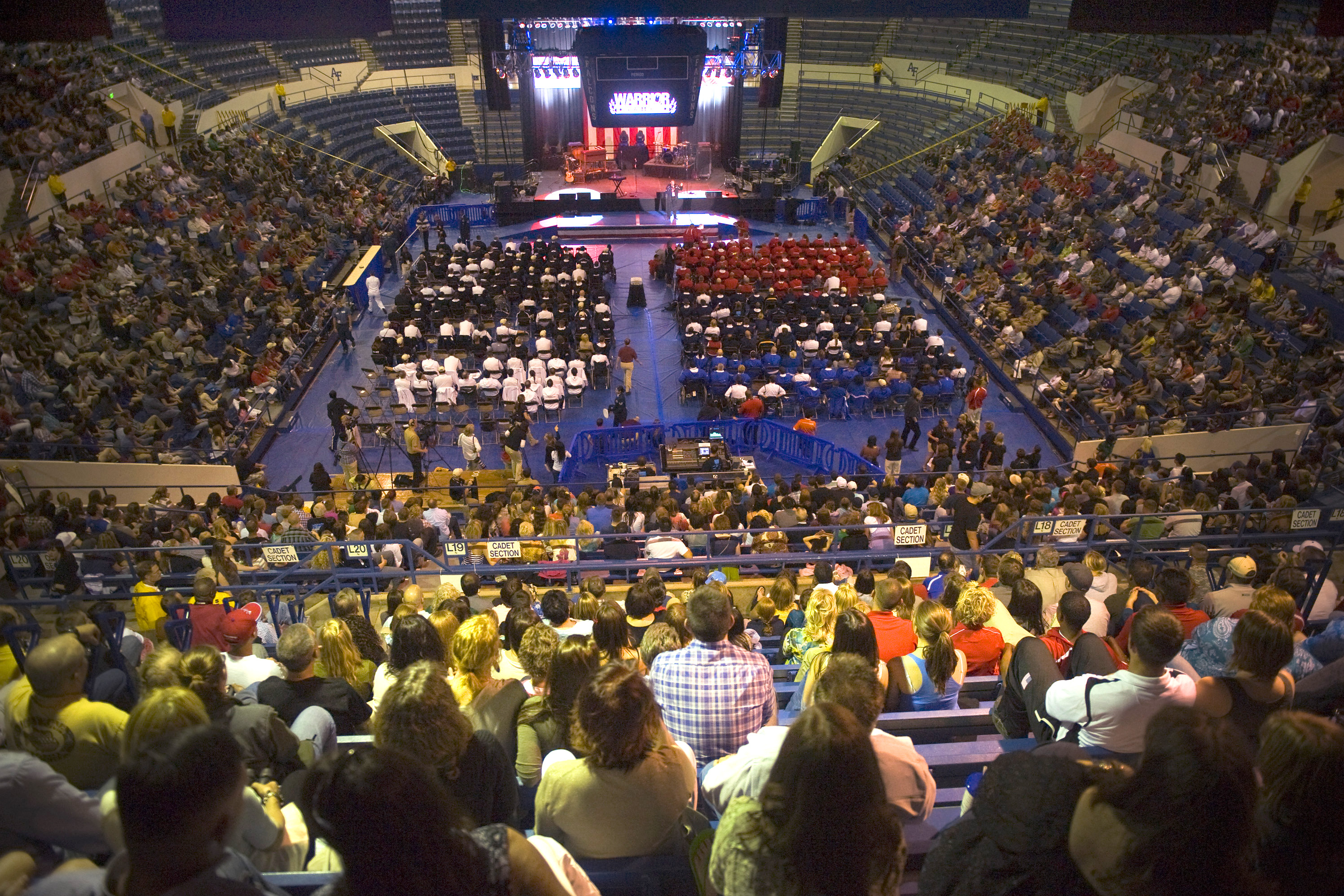
The 2011 Warrior Games closing ceremony at Clune Arena

=== Clune Arena ===
The Clune Arena is the basketball arena in the complex, named after Colonel John J. Clune, long-time USAFA Director of Athletics, and seats 5,508 people.

=== Cadet Ice Arena ===
The Cadet Ice Arena is a 2,217-seat hockey rink that is home to the Academy's Falcon ice hockey team. It was built in 1968, and is part of the Cadet Field House. The team now competes in Atlantic Hockey along with Army and others in the conference.

== Location ==
The Cadet Field House is located across the street from the Cadet Gymnasium. The two buildings are connected by an underground tunnel.

== Trophies ==
The Cadet Field House houses the Commander-in-Chief's Trophy in those years when Air Force is in possession of it.

== See also ==
- List of NCAA Division I basketball arenas
