= 1993–94 Navy Midshipmen men's basketball team =

American college basketball season

1993–94 Navy Midshipmen men's basketball

Patriot League tournament champions Patriot League Regular Season champions

NCAA men's Division I tournament
- Conference: Patriot League
- Record: 17–13 (9–5 Patriot)
- Head coach: Don DeVoe (2nd season)
- Home arena: Alumni Hall

1993–94 Patriot League men's basketball standings
	Conf.				Overall
Team	W		L	PCT	W		L	PCT
Navy †	9	–	5	.643	17	–	13	.567
Fordham	9	–	5	.643	12	–	15	.444
Colgate	9	–	5	.643	17	–	12	.586
Holy Cross	9	–	5	.643	14	–	14	.500
Bucknell	6	–	8	.429	10	–	17	.370
Lehigh	6	–	8	.429	10	–	17	.370
Lafayette	4	–	10	.286	9	–	19	.321
Army	4	–	10	.286	7	–	20	.259
† 1994 Patriot League tournament winner

The 1993–94 Navy Midshipmen men's basketball team represented the United States Naval Academy during the 1993–94 NCAA Division I men's basketball season. The Midshipmen were led by second-year head coach Don DeVoe, and played their home games at Alumni Hall in Annapolis, Maryland as members of the Patriot League.

== Roster ==
1993–94 Navy Midshipmen men's basketball team
Players	Coaches
Pos. / # / Name / Height / Weight / Year / Previous school / Hometown; G / / T. J. Hall / 6 ft 3 in (1.91 m) / — / Jr	Head coach: Don DeVoe; Assistant coach(es) Legend: (C) Team captain; (S) Suspended; (I) Ineligible; (W) Walk-on; Injured; Current redshirt

== Schedule and results ==
Date time, TV	Rank^{#}	Opponent^{#}	Result	Record	Site (attendance) city, state
Non-conference Regular season
Nov 27, 1993*		Air Force	W 77–63	1–0	Alumni Hall; Annapolis, Maryland
Patriot League Regular season
Patriot League tournament
NCAA tournament
Mar 17, 1994*	(16 W)	vs. (1 W) No. 5 Missouri; First round	L 53–76	17–13	Dee Events Center; Ogden, Utah
*Non-conference game. ^{#}Rankings from AP Poll. (#) Tournament seedings in parentheses. W=West. All times are in Eastern Time.
