= David Robinson =

American basketball player (born 1965)

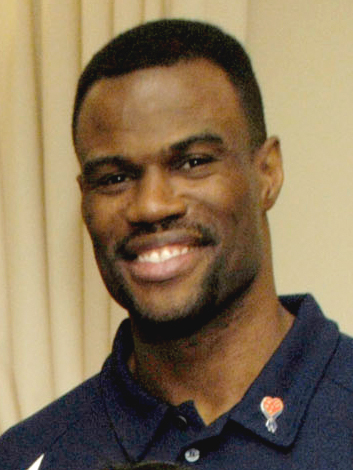
- Robinson in 2006

Personal information
- Born: August 6, 1965 (age 61) Key West, Florida, U.S.
- Listed height: 7 ft 1 in (2.16 m)
- Listed weight: 250 lb (113 kg)

Career information
- High school: Osbourn Park (Manassas, Virginia)
- College: Navy (1983–1987)
- NBA draft: 1987: 1st round, 1st overall pick
- Drafted by: San Antonio Spurs
- Playing career: 1989–2003
- Position: Center
- Number: 50

Career history
- 1989–2003: San Antonio Spurs

Career highlights
- 2× NBA champion (1999, 2003); NBA Most Valuable Player (1995); 10× NBA All-Star (1990–1996, 1998, 2000, 2001); 4× All-NBA First Team (1991, 1992, 1995, 1996); 2× All-NBA Second Team (1994, 1998); 4× All-NBA Third Team (1990, 1993, 2000, 2001); NBA Defensive Player of the Year (1992); 4× NBA All-Defensive First Team (1991, 1992, 1995, 1996); 4× NBA All-Defensive Second Team (1990, 1993, 1994, 1998); NBA scoring champion (1994); NBA rebounding leader (1991); NBA blocks leader (1992); NBA Rookie of the Year (1990); NBA All-Rookie First Team (1990); NBA anniversary team (50th, 75th); No. 50 retired by San Antonio Spurs; Sports Illustrated Sportsman of the Year (2003); National college player of the year (1987); Consensus first-team All-American (1987); Consensus second-team All-American (1986); NCAA rebounding leader (1986); 2× NCAA blocks leader (1986, 1987); 3× CAA Player of the Year (1985–1987); 3× First-team All-CAA (1985–1987); 2× CAA tournament MVP (1986, 1987); CAA All-Defensive Team (1987); CAA Rookie of the Year (1984); CAA All-Rookie Team (1984); USA Basketball Male Athlete of the Year (1986)

Career NBA statistics
- Points: 20,790 (21.1 ppg)
- Rebounds: 10,497 (10.6 rpg)
- Blocks: 2,954 (3.0 bpg)
- Stats at NBA.com
- Stats at Basketball Reference
- Basketball Hall of Fame
- FIBA Hall of Fame
Medals
Men's basketball
Representing the United States
Olympic Games
Gold medal – first place	1992 Barcelona	Team competition
Gold medal – first place	1996 Atlanta	Team competition
Bronze medal – third place	1988 Seoul	Team competition
World Championships
Gold medal – first place	1986 Spain	Team competition
Pan American Games
Silver medal – second place	1987 Indianapolis	Team competition
FIBA Americas Championship
Gold medal – first place	1992 Portland	Men's basketball

David Maurice Robinson (born August 6, 1965) is an American former professional basketball player. Nicknamed "the Admiral" for his service in the U.S. Navy, he spent his entire 14-year career with National Basketball Association (NBA) franchise San Antonio Spurs and is now a minority owner of the team. He is widely considered one of the greatest centers in both college basketball and NBA history.

Robinson played basketball for the United States Naval Academy and was selected by the Spurs as the first overall pick of the 1987 NBA draft, but because he had to fulfill his active-duty obligation with the Navy, he would not play his first game until 1989. Among other accolades, he was a two-time NBA champion (1999 and 2003), a 10-time NBA All-Star, a 10-time All-NBA Team member, the 1995 NBA Most Valuable Player (MVP), the 1992 NBA Defensive Player of the Year (DPOY), a two-time Olympic Gold Medal winner (1992 and 1996), and a two-time Naismith Memorial Basketball Hall of Fame inductee (2009 for his individual career; 2010 as a member of the gold medal-winning "Dream Team" at the 1992 Barcelona Olympics).

Robinson is also a two-time U.S. Olympic Hall of Fame inductee (2008 individually, 2009 as a member of the 1992 Olympic team). He was honored as one of the league's all-time players by being named to the NBA 50th Anniversary (1996) and 75th Anniversary Teams (2021).

== Early life, family and education ==
Robinson was born in Key West, Florida, the second child of Ambrose and Freda Robinson. Since Robinson's father was in the U.S. Navy, the family moved frequently. After his father retired from the Navy, the family settled in Woodbridge, Virginia, where Robinson excelled in school and in most sports, except basketball. Robinson attended Osbourn Park High School in Manassas, Virginia, just outside Washington, D.C., where Robinson's father was working as an engineer.

Robinson was of average height for most of his childhood and teenage years, standing 5 ft 9 in (1.75 m) tall in his junior year of high school (age 16–17). However, during his senior year (age 17–18) in high school, he experienced a large growth spurt and grew to 6 ft 6 in (1.98 m). He had not played organized basketball or attended any basketball camps, but the school's basketball coach added him to the team. Robinson earned all-area and all-district honors but generated little interest among college basketball coaches.

Robinson graduated from Osbourn Park in 1983. He achieved a score of 1320 on the SAT and subsequently attended the United States Naval Academy, where he would major in mathematics and play on the basketball team. At the time the Naval Academy had a height restriction of 6 ft 6 in (1.98 m) for all midshipmen, but in the autumn when the new academic year began, Robinson had grown to 6 ft 7 in (2.01 m). Assuming that he was unlikely to grow much more, the academy's superintendent granted him a waiver, but Robinson continued growing, and by the start of his second year at the academy he had nearly reached his adult height of 7 ft 1 in (2.16 m), which later prevented him from serving on any U.S. Navy ships.

In 2011, Robinson earned a Master of Arts in Administration (with concentration in organizational development) from the University of the Incarnate Word to better "understand how businesses work and how to build them."

== College career and military service ==
Robinson is widely considered to be the best basketball player in Naval Academy history. He chose the jersey number 50 after his idol Ralph Sampson. He began college with no expectations of playing in the NBA, but in Robinson's final two years he was a consensus All-American and won college basketball's two most prestigious player awards, the Naismith and Wooden Awards, as a Naval Academy first classman (senior). In 1986, Robinson led Navy, a number seven seed, within a game of the Final Four before falling to Duke in the East Regional Final. Robinson played his first three years for the Midshipmen under Paul Evans (who left Navy to coach at Pitt) and his senior season under former University of Georgia interim head coach Pete Herrmann. Upon graduation, he became eligible for the 1987 NBA draft and was selected by the San Antonio Spurs with the first overall pick; however, the Spurs had to wait two years because he had to fulfill his active-duty obligation with the Navy.

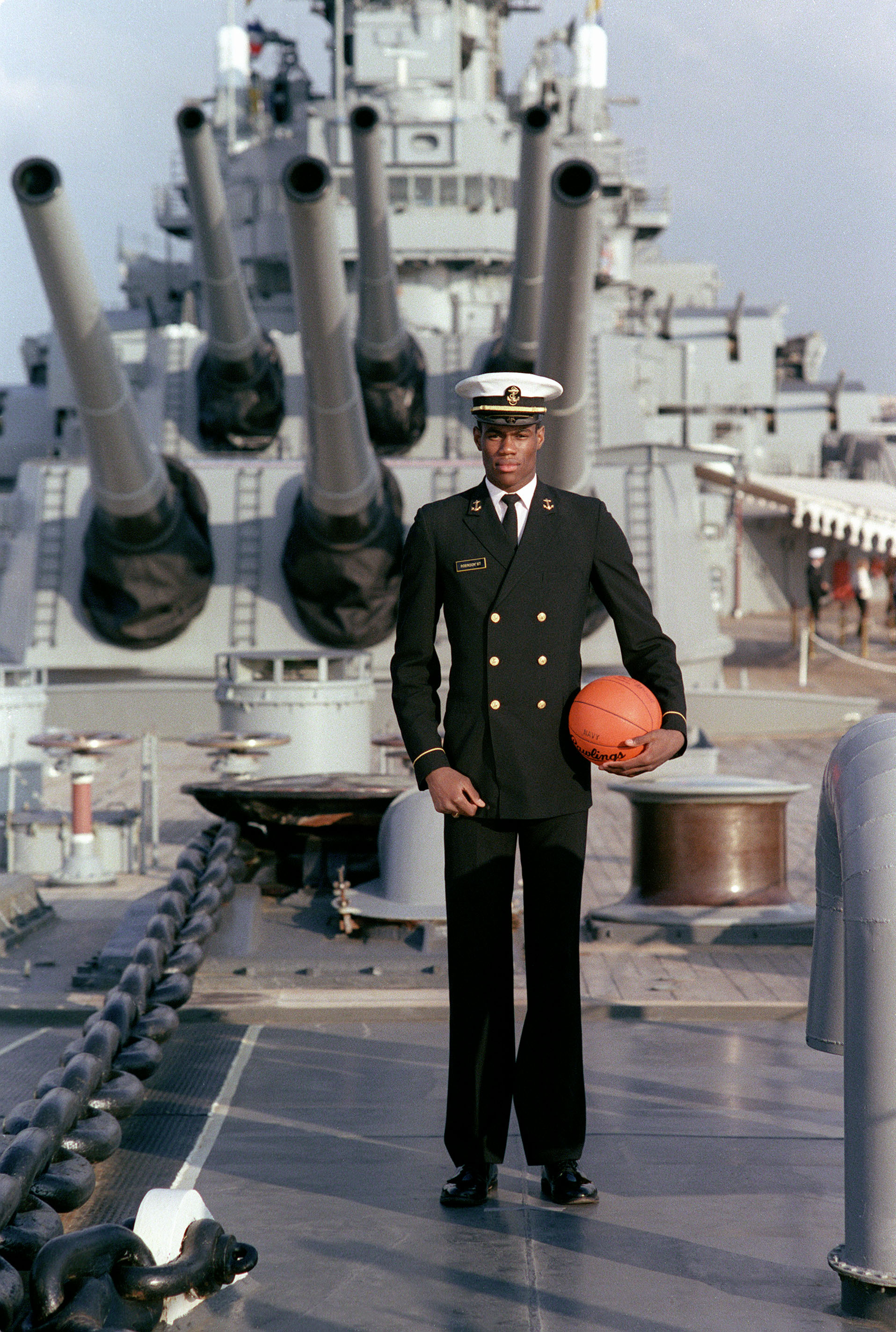
Robinson aboard USS Iowa in 1986

Robinson considered leaving the academy after his second year, before incurring an obligation to serve on active duty. He decided to stay after discussing with the superintendent the likelihood that his height would prevent him from serving at sea as an unrestricted line officer, which would be detrimental to his naval career and might make it impossible for him to receive a commission at all. As a compromise, Secretary of the Navy John Lehman allowed Robinson to train for and receive a commission as a staff officer in the Civil Engineer Corps. As a result, Robinson was commissioned in the Naval Reserve and was required to serve only an initial active-duty obligation of two years. After graduating from the Naval Academy, Robinson became a civil engineering officer at the Naval Submarine Base Kings Bay in Georgia. He was regularly featured in recruiting materials for the service. Despite the nickname "Admiral", the highest rank Robinson earned during his military service was lieutenant (junior grade).

== Professional career ==
=== San Antonio Spurs (1989–2003) ===
==== Rookie of the Year, DPOY award and scoring title (1989–1994) ====
Since he had not signed a contract, NBA regulations stated that Robinson could have reentered the draft after his naval service. Although there was speculation that he might choose not to sign with the Spurs, Robinson agreed to move to San Antonio for the 1989–90 season, but the Spurs agreed to pay him as much as the average of the salaries of the two highest-paid players in the league each year, or release him to free agency.

The Spurs had spent the second half of the 1980s as an also-ran, bottoming out in 1988–89 season with a 21–61 record, the worst in franchise history at the time. Robinson led the Spurs to the greatest single-season turnaround in NBA history at the time (a record the Spurs themselves broke in 1997–98 season, after drafting Tim Duncan, which was then broken by the Boston Celtics in the 2007–08 NBA season). The Spurs leaped to a record of 56–26 for a remarkable 35 game improvement. They advanced to the second round of the Western Conference playoffs where they lost in seven games to the eventual conference champion Portland Trail Blazers. Following the 1989–90 season, he was unanimously named the NBA Rookie of the Year, and subsequently Sega produced a game featuring him entitled David Robinson's Supreme Court. The Spurs made the playoffs seven more seasons in a row. In the 1991–92 season Robinson led the league in blocks and was named the NBA Defensive Player of the Year. Robinson also made the 1992 US Olympic Dream Team that won the gold medal in Barcelona. During the 1993–94 season, he became locked in a duel for the NBA scoring title with Shaquille O'Neal, scoring 71 points (breaking George Gervin's single-game franchise record of 63) against the Los Angeles Clippers to win it. In that season, Robinson averaged a career-high 29.8 points per game, 10.7 rebounds per game, career-high 4.8 assists per game and 3.3 blocks per game.

==== MVP title, playoff upsets and injury (1994–1998) ====
Robinson went on to win the MVP trophy in 1995, and in 1996 he was named one of the 50 Greatest Players in NBA History. Still, from 1991 to 1996, Robinson was thwarted in his quest to claim the one prize that had eluded him: an NBA title. During that span the Spurs were eliminated from the playoffs by the Warriors, Suns (twice), Jazz (twice), and Rockets. The loss against the Rockets was particularly painful for Robinson because it occurred in the Western Conference Finals with Robinson playing head-to-head against his chief rival, Hakeem Olajuwon. By his own admission, Robinson was outplayed by Olajuwon in the series, their only meetings in post-season play. In a LIFE magazine story, he seemed perplexed. “Solve Hakeem?” said Robinson. “You don’t solve Hakeem.”

Early in the 1996–97 season, Robinson's dreams of becoming a champion seemed to vanish when he hurt his back in the preseason. He finally returned in December, but six games later broke his foot in a home game against the Miami Heat, and ended up missing the rest of the regular season. As a result of the injury to Robinson and other key players (most notably Sean Elliott, who missed more than half the season), the Spurs finished the season with a 20–62 record. However, his injury proved to be a blessing in disguise. With the third-worst record in the league, the Spurs won the NBA Draft Lottery—and with it, the first pick in the next year's NBA draft. They used that pick to select Tim Duncan out of Wake Forest University, who was, after a few years, the final key to Robinson's quest for an NBA title.

==== Championship season (1998–1999) ====
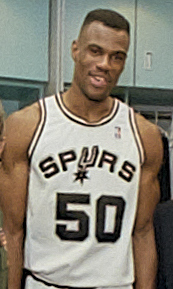
Robinson with the Spurs in 2000

The later years of Robinson's career were plagued by back ailments. Before the start of the 1998–99 season, the NBA owners and NBA commissioner David Stern locked out the NBA Players' Association to force negotiations on a new Collective Bargaining Agreement. This lockout lasted for 202 days, well into the regular NBA season, before an agreement was finally reached. After playing a truncated 50-game season, the Spurs finished with an NBA-best record of 37–13, giving them the home-court advantage throughout the playoffs.

The Spurs blitzed through the first three rounds of the NBA playoffs, beating the Minnesota Timberwolves, Los Angeles Lakers, and Portland Trail Blazers by a combined record of 11–1 to reach the NBA Finals for the first time ever. In the Finals, the combination of Robinson in the post and second-year power forward Tim Duncan proved overpowering, and the Spurs beat the New York Knicks in five games to become the first former American Basketball Association team to win an NBA title. Duncan was named Finals MVP.

Robinson and Duncan were nicknamed "The Twin Towers".

==== Twilight years and second championship (1999–2003) ====
During the 1999–2000 season, Robinson averaged 17.8 points per game, 10.0 rebounds per game and 2.3 blocks per game in 80 games. The Spurs made it to the playoffs as the fourth seed, but were defeated by the Phoenix Suns in the first round of the playoffs despite Robinson's 23.5 points, 13.8 rebounds, and 3 blocks per game.

During the 2000–01 season, Robinson averaged 14.4 points, 8.6 rebounds, and 2.5 blocks per game, earning his tenth and final NBA All-Star selection. The Spurs finished the regular season with a 58–24 record, securing the top seed. In the playoffs, San Antonio defeated the Minnesota Timberwolves in the first round and the Dallas Mavericks in the Western Conference Semifinals before being swept by the Los Angeles Lakers in the Western Conference Finals.

During the 2001–02 season, Robinson appeared in 78 games and averaged 12.2 points, 8.3 rebounds, 1.2 assists, 1.1 steals, and 1.8 blocks per game. San Antonio finished the regular season with a 58–24 record. In the playoffs, the Spurs defeated the Seattle SuperSonics in the first round before being eliminated by the defending champion Los Angeles Lakers in five games during the Western Conference Semifinals.

Robinson announced he would retire from basketball following the 2002–03 season. In 64 regular-season games, he averaged 8.5 points, 7.9 rebounds, and 1.8 blocks per game. San Antonio finished the regular season with a 60–22 record, securing the first seed in the Western Conference and the best overall record in the league.

On June 15, 2003, in the finale of Robinson's career, the Spurs won another NBA title with an 88–77 victory over the New Jersey Nets in Game 6 of the 2003 NBA Finals. During this game, Robinson scored 13 points and secured 17 rebounds. He and the year's regular season and NBA Finals MVP Tim Duncan shared Sports Illustrated magazine's 2003 Sportsmen of the Year award.

== Player profile ==
Robinson possessed tremendous mobility in the post, speed, and ball-handling, especially for a center. With good hands on both offense and defense, Robinson was nearly unstoppable on both sides of the floor, throwing down dunks and blocking shots. He was also noted for his strong midrange jumpshot. Robinson was left-handed.

Robinson averaged 21.1 points per game, 10.7 rebounds per game, 3 blocks per game, and 2.5 assists per game over 987 games in his NBA career. He is also one of only a very small group of players to have scored over 20,000 career points in the NBA, as well as being one of only four players to have officially recorded a quadruple-double (with 34 points, 10 rebounds, 10 assists, and 10 blocks against the Detroit Pistons on February 17, 1994).

He is also one of only eleven players to record 70 or more points in a single game, having scored 71 against the Los Angeles Clippers on April 24, 1994. Only Wilt Chamberlain (70, 72, 73 twice, 78, and 100), Devin Booker, Joel Embiid (70 each), Elgin Baylor, Damian Lillard, Donovan Mitchell (71 each), Luka Dončić, David Thompson (73 each), Kobe Bryant (81), and Bam Adebayo (83) have scored 70 or more points in a single game.

Robinson is also noteworthy for his harmonious relationship with Tim Duncan. Sportswriter Chris Sheridan noted that it was rare for someone like Robinson to have welcomed and mentored Duncan as willingly as he did, and to have reduced his own role in the team's offense to accommodate a younger star. In 2022, to commemorate the NBA's 75th Anniversary The Athletic ranked their top 75 players of all time, and named Robinson as the 20th greatest player in NBA history.

== NBA career statistics ==
Legend
GP	Games played	GS	Games started	MPG	Minutes per game
FG%	Field goal percentage	3P%	3-point field goal percentage	FT%	Free throw percentage
RPG	Rebounds per game	APG	Assists per game	SPG	Steals per game
BPG	Blocks per game	PPG	Points per game	**Bold**	Career high
†	Won an NBA championship	*	Led the league

=== Regular season ===
Year	Team	GP	GS	MPG	FG%	3P%	FT%	RPG	APG	SPG	BPG	PPG
1989–90	San Antonio	**82***	81	36.6	.531	.000	.732	12.0	2.0	1.7	3.9	24.3
1990–91	San Antonio	**82***	81	37.7	**.552**	.143	.762	**13.0***	2.5	1.5	3.9	25.6
1991–92	San Antonio	68	68	37.7	.551	.125	.701	12.2	2.7	**2.3**	**4.5***	23.2
1992–93	San Antonio	**82***	**82***	39.2	.501	.176	.732	11.7	3.7	1.5	3.2	23.4
1993–94	San Antonio	80	80	**40.5**	.507	**.345**	.749	10.7	**4.8**	1.7	3.3	**29.8***
1994–95	San Antonio	81	81	38.0	.530	.300	**.774**	10.8	2.9	1.7	3.2	27.6
1995–96	San Antonio	**82**	**82***	36.8	.516	.333	.761	12.2	3.0	1.4	3.3	25.0
1996–97	San Antonio	6	6	24.5	.500	.000	.654	8.5	1.3	1.0	1.0	17.7
1997–98	San Antonio	73	73	33.7	.511	.250	.735	10.6	2.7	.9	2.6	21.6
1998–99†	San Antonio	49	49	31.7	.509	.000	.658	10.0	2.1	1.4	2.4	15.8
1999–00	San Antonio	80	80	32.0	.512	.000	.726	9.6	1.8	1.2	2.3	17.8
2000–01	San Antonio	80	80	29.6	.486	.000	.747	8.6	1.5	1.0	2.5	14.4
2001–02	San Antonio	78	78	29.5	.507	.000	.681	8.3	1.2	1.1	1.8	12.2
2002–03†	San Antonio	64	64	26.2	.469	.000	.710	7.9	1.0	.8	1.7	8.5
Career		987	985	34.7	.518	.250	.736	10.6	2.5	1.4	3.0	21.1
All-Star		10	3	18.4	.588	.000	.695	6.2	.8	1.3	1.3	14.1

=== Playoffs ===
Year	Team	GP	GS	MPG	FG%	3P%	FT%	RPG	APG	SPG	BPG	PPG
1990	San Antonio	10	10	37.5	.533	.000	.677	12.0	2.3	1.1	**4.0**	24.3
1991	San Antonio	4	4	41.5	**.686**	.000	**.868**	13.5	2.0	1.5	3.8	**25.8**
1993	San Antonio	10	10	**42.1**	.465	.000	.664	12.6	**4.0**	1.0	3.6	23.1
1994	San Antonio	4	4	36.5	.411	.000	.741	10.0	3.5	.8	2.5	20.0
1995	San Antonio	15	15	41.5	.446	**.200**	.812	12.1	3.1	1.5	2.6	25.3
1996	San Antonio	10	10	35.3	.516	.000	.667	10.1	2.4	1.5	2.5	23.6
1998	San Antonio	9	9	39.2	.425	.000	.635	**14.1**	2.6	1.2	3.3	19.4
1999†	San Antonio	17	17	35.3	.483	.000	.722	9.9	2.5	1.6	2.4	15.6
2000	San Antonio	4	4	38.8	.373	.000	.762	13.8	2.5	**1.8**	3.0	23.5
2001	San Antonio	13	13	31.5	.472	.000	.695	11.8	1.7	1.3	2.4	16.6
2002	San Antonio	4	4	20.3	.474	.000	.000	5.8	1.3	.8	.8	4.5
2003†	San Antonio	**23**	**23**	23.4	.542	.000	.667	6.6	.9	.8	1.3	7.8
Career		123	123	34.3	.479	.100	.708	10.6	2.3	1.2	2.5	18.1

== National team career ==
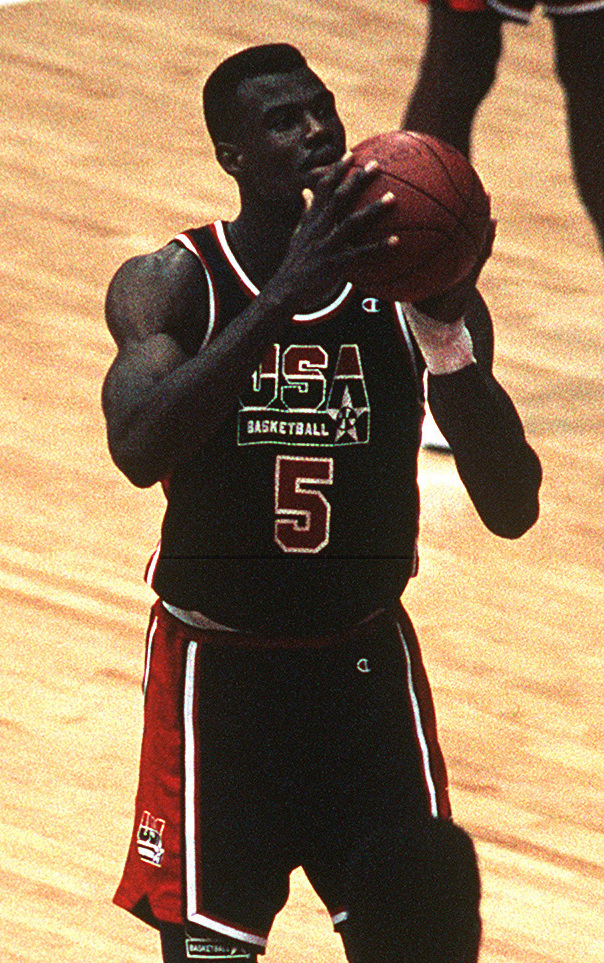
Robinson at the free-throw line in 1992 as part of the “Dream Team”

David Robinson was a member of the United States national team at the 1986 FIBA World Championship, 1987 Pan American Games, 1988 Summer Olympics, 1992 Summer Olympics, and 1996 Summer Olympics. He won the gold medal at all tournaments except the 1987 Pan Am Games, where he won a silver medal, and the 1988 Summer Olympics, where he won a bronze medal.

== Other ventures ==
In 2001, Robinson founded and funded the $9 million Carver Academy in San Antonio, a non-profit private school named for George Washington Carver to provide more opportunities for inner-city children. In 2012, the school became a public charter school and its name changed to IDEA Carver. Robinson continues to be a very active participant in the school's day-to-day activities.

In 2008, Robinson partnered with Daniel Bassichis, formerly of Goldman Sachs and a board member of The Carver Academy, to form Admiral Capital Group, a private equity firm whose mission is to invest in opportunities that can provide both financial and social returns. Robinson's primary motivation in starting Admiral Capital was to create a source of additional financial support for The Carver Academy. Its portfolio is worth more than $100 million and includes nine hotels and office buildings across the US as well as Centerplate, one of the largest hospitality companies in the world. Admiral Capital Group also partnered with Living Cities to form the Admiral Center, a non-profit created to support other athletes and entertainers with their philanthropic initiatives. Robinson is also co-owner of a Jaguar Land Rover dealership in San Juan, Texas.

== Personal life ==
Robinson with his family at the 2022 NBA All-Star Game

Robinson married Valerie Hoggatt in 1991. They have three sons, David Jr., Corey, and Justin. Corey attended Notre Dame and was a wide receiver on the football team before ending his playing career in 2016 on medical advice due to multiple concussions prior to what would have been his senior season. He was student body president for the 2016–17 school year. Justin, a 6 ft 8 in (2.03 m) forward in basketball and a two-time all-state selection in Texas, began attending Duke University in August 2015. He was initially recruited to the Duke team as a "preferred walk-on" with the opportunity to eventually earn a scholarship, but he was placed on scholarship before his arrival at Duke. On September 18, 2020, Mornar Bar of Erste Liga in Montenegro announced that they had signed Justin, signaling the start to his professional basketball career. By 2026, Justin was reported to be a Lakers player development coach.

David Robinson became a Christian on June 8, 1991, after being encouraged to read the Bible.

== Awards and honors ==
NBA

- 2× NBA champion (1999, 2003)
- NBA Most Valuable Player (1995)
- NBA Defensive Player of the Year (1992)
- 10× NBA All-Star (1990–1996, 1998, 2000, 2001)
- 4× All-NBA First Team (1991, 1992, 1995, 1996)
- 2× All-NBA Second Team (1994, 1998)
- 4× All-NBA Third Team (1990, 1993, 2000, 2001)
- 4× NBA All-Defensive First Team (1991, 1992, 1995, 1996)
- 4× NBA All-Defensive Second Team (1990, 1993, 1994, 1998)
- NBA Rookie of the Year (1990)
- NBA All-Rookie First Team (1990)
- NBA scoring champion (1994)
- NBA rebounding leader (1991)
- NBA blocks leader (1992)
- 3× NBA free throw scoring leaders: (1994, 1995, 1996)
- 5× IBM Award (1990, 1991, 1994–1996)
- NBA Sportsmanship Award (2001)
- J. Walter Kennedy Citizenship Award (2003)
- NBA Shooting Stars Champion (2008)
- NBA anniversary team (50th, 75th)
- No. 50 retired by San Antonio Spurs

USA Basketball

- USA Basketball Male Athlete of the Year (1986)
- 2× Olympic Gold Medal (1992, 1996)
- 1988 Olympic Bronze Medal
- 1986 FIBA World Championship Gold Medal
- 1987 Pan American Games Silver Medal
- 1992 FIBA Americas Championship Gold Medal

NCAA

- 3× CAA Regular Season Champion (1985–1987)
- 3× CAA Tournament Champion (1985–1987)
  - 2× CAA tournament MVP (1986, 1987)
- Consensus National college player of the year (1987)
  - Sporting News Player of the Year (1987)
  - Oscar Robertson Trophy (1987)
  - AP Player of the Year (1987)
  - Naismith Player of the Year (1987)
  - NABC Player of the Year (1987)
  - John R. Wooden Award (1987)
  - UPI Player of the Year (1987)
  - Adolph Rupp Trophy (1987)
- Consensus first-team All-American (1987)
  - AP first-team All-American (1987)
  - USBWA first-team All-American (1987)
  - NABC first-team All-American (1987)
  - UPI first-team All-American (1987)
- Consensus second-team All-American (1986)
  - AP third-team All-American (1986)
  - USBWA second-team All-American (1986)
  - NABC second-team All-American (1986)
  - UPI third-team All-American (1986)
- NCAA rebounding leader (1986)
- 2× NCAA blocks leader (1986, 1987)
- 3× CAA Player of the Year (1985–1987)
- 3× First-team All-CAA (1985–1987)
- CAA All-Defensive Team (1987)
- CAA Rookie of the Year (1984)
- Today's Top VI Award (1988)
- NCAA Silver Anniversary Award (2012)
- Coach Wooden "Keys to Life" Award (2004)
- NCAA Gerald R. Ford Award (2021)

Halls of Fame

- 2× Naismith Basketball Hall of Fame
  - Class of 2009 – individual
  - Class of 2010 – as a member of the "Dream Team"
- 2× U.S. Olympic Hall of Fame
  - Class of 2008 – individual
  - Class of 2009 – as a member of the "Dream Team"
- 2× FIBA Hall of Fame
  - Class of 2013 - individual
  - Class of 2017 - as a member of the "Dream Team"
- U.S. Naval Academy Sports Hall of Fame
  - Class of 1994 - individual
- Texas Business Hall of Fame
  - Class of 2024 - individual
- San Antonio Sports Hall of Fame
  - Class of 2004 – as individual
  - Class of 2025 – as a member of the 1999 San Antonio Spurs Championship Team

Media

- 2003 Sports Illustrated Sportsman of the Year
- Sporting News NBA MVP (1995)
- Sporting News NBA Rookie of the Year (1990)
- Sporting News NBA 1990s All-Decade Second Team
- In the Classroom with David Robinson video made for distribution across American public schools in collaboration with public television producers

Other

- Academy of Achievement Golden Plate Award (1987)
- Heisman Humanitarian Award (2013)
- Nation's Finest 50 Award (2023)

== Charitable efforts ==
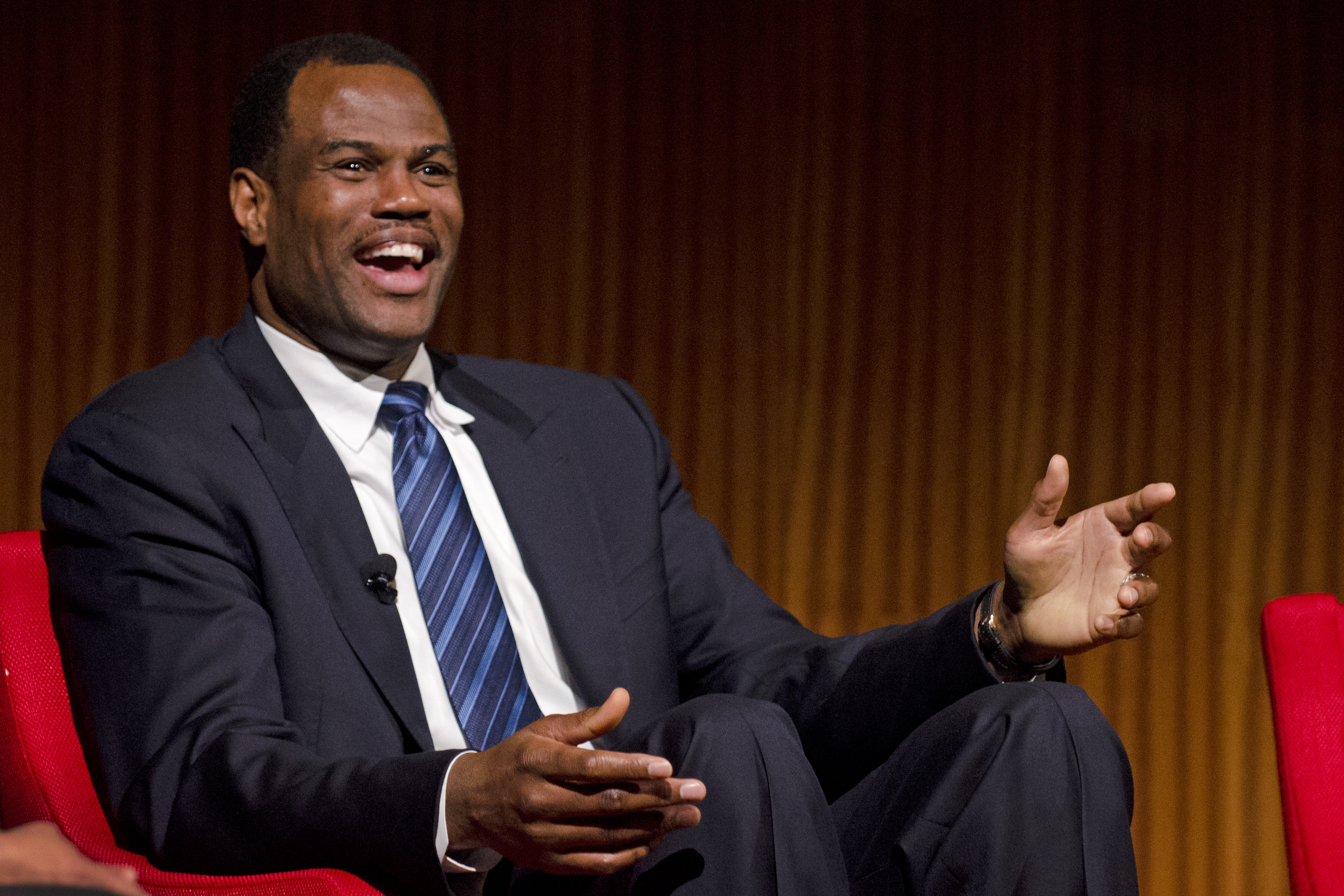
Robinson at the LBJ Presidential Library in 2014

In addition to his lengthy NBA career, Robinson is also noted for his charitable work. In 1991, Robinson visited with fifth-graders at Gates Elementary School in San Antonio and challenged them to finish school and go to college. He offered a $2,000 scholarship to everyone who did. In 1998, proving even better than his word, Robinson awarded $8,000 to each of those students who had completed his challenge. In perhaps his greatest civic and charitable achievement, David and his wife, Valerie, founded the Carver Academy in San Antonio, which opened its doors in September 2001. To date, the Robinsons have donated more than $11 million to the school.

In March 2003, in recognition of his outstanding contributions to charity, the NBA renamed its award for outstanding charitable efforts in honor of Robinson. Winners of the NBA's Community Assist Award receive the David Robinson Plaque, with the inscription "Following the standard set by NBA Legend David Robinson who improved the community piece by piece." The award is given out monthly by the league to recognize players for their charitable efforts. Robinson is also the recipient of the William E. Simon Prize for Philanthropic Leadership. In 2011, in recognition of his philanthropic efforts with the Carver Academy, Robinson received the Children's Champion Award from the charitable organization Children's Hunger Fund. In 2018, Robinson became a member of the V Foundation for Cancer Research's board of directors.

== See also ==
=== NBA ===
- List of NBA career scoring leaders
- List of NBA career rebounding leaders
- List of NBA career blocks leaders
- List of NBA career free throw scoring leaders
- List of NBA career playoff blocks leaders
- List of NBA annual scoring leaders
- List of NBA annual rebounding leaders
- List of NBA annual blocks leaders
- List of NBA single-game scoring leaders
- List of NBA single-game blocks leaders
- List of NBA rookie single-season scoring leaders
- List of NBA single-season blocks per game leaders
- List of NBA players who have spent their entire career with one franchise
- Quadruple-double

=== College ===
- List of NCAA Division I men's basketball players with 13 or more blocks in a game
- List of NCAA Division I men's basketball players with 2000 points and 1000 rebounds
- List of NCAA Division I men's basketball season blocks leaders
- List of NCAA Division I men's basketball season rebounding leaders
