= Terry Crosby =

American basketball player

Personal information
- Born: January 4, 1957 (age 69) Toledo, Ohio, U.S.
- Listed height: 6 ft 4 in (1.93 m)
- Listed weight: 195 lb (88 kg)

Career information
- High school: DeVilbiss (Toledo, Ohio)
- College: Tennessee (1975–1979)
- NBA draft: 1979: 3rd round, 62nd overall pick
- Drafted by: Kansas City Kings
- Position: Point guard
- Number: 12

Career history
- 1979: Kansas City Kings

Career highlights
- Fourth-team Parade All-American (1975)
- Stats at NBA.com
- Stats at Basketball Reference

Terry Dale Crosby (born January 4, 1957, in Toledo, Ohio) is an American former professional basketball player.

A 1975 graduate of DeVilbiss High School, he was selected by the Kansas City Kings in the 18th pick of the third round in the 1979 NBA draft out of the University of Tennessee. He also went on to have a basketball career in England and elsewhere in Europe.

== Career statistics ==
Legend
GP	Games played	GS	Games started	MPG	Minutes per game
FG%	Field goal percentage	3P%	3-point field goal percentage	FT%	Free throw percentage
RPG	Rebounds per game	APG	Assists per game	SPG	Steals per game
BPG	Blocks per game	PPG	Points per game	**Bold**	Career high

=== NBA ===
==== Regular season ====
Year	Team	GP	MPG	FG%	3P%	FT%	RPG	APG	SPG	BPG	PPG
1979–80	Kansas City	4	7.0	.500	–	1.000	.3	1.8	.0	.0	1.5
