= Wetherby Gymnasium =

Arena in Morehead, Kentucky

- Interactive map of Wetherby Gymnasium
- Location: Morehead, Kentucky
- Coordinates: 38.1889679°N 83.430886°W
- Owner: Morehead State University
- Capacity: 4,000

Construction
- Built: 1956
- Closed: 2024
- Demolished: 2024

Tenant
- Morehead State

The Wetherby Gymnasium was a 4,000-seat multi-purpose arena at Morehead State University (MSU) in Morehead, Kentucky. It was named for former Kentucky Governor Lawrence Wetherby and was built in 1956. The facility was demolished in summer 2024.

Wetherby Gymnasium was the home of MSU's Eagles volleyball teams until they moved to Ellis Johnson Arena in 2018. Prior to the Johnson Arena opening in 1981, it also hosted the MSU basketball team.
