= Hassan Booker =

American basketball player and coach

- Booker shoots a layup during Navy's 1998 NCAA tournament game against North Carolina

Personal information
- Born: September 1, 1975 (age 51)
- Listed height: 6 ft 3 in (1.91 m)

Career information
- High school: University (Los Angeles, California)
- College: Navy (1994–1998)
- NBA draft: 1998: undrafted
- Position: Forward

Career history

Coaching
- 2003–2005: Navy (women's assistant)
- 2005–2007: Tulsa (men's assistant)

Career highlights
- Chip Hilton Player of the Year (1998); 2× First-team All-Patriot League (1997, 1998); Patriot League tournament MVP (1997)

Hassan Mustafa Booker (born September 1, 1975) is an American former college basketball player and coach best known for his playing career at the United States Naval Academy (Navy) from 1994 to 1998. He was a key performer during a four-year stretch that saw the Midshipmen win three Patriot League regular season titles, two Patriot League tournament titles (plus finish as runners-up in a third), and make back-to-back NCAA tournament appearances in 1997 and 1998. Booker was a two-time first-team All-Patriot League selection in his junior and senior seasons. As a junior, he was named the Patriot League Tournament MVP after averaging 17.5 points and 11 rebounds in wins over Lafayette and Bucknell. At the conclusion of the 1997–98 season, Booker was named the winner of the Chip Hilton Player of the Year Award, a national award given by the NCAA to a Division I player who demonstrated outstanding character, leadership, integrity, humility, sportsmanship, and talent.

After graduating in 1998, Booker served in the United States Navy as a surface warfare officer and lieutenant. In summer 2003 he returned to the Naval Academy to teach advanced navigation in the professional development department. During the 2003–04 and 2004–05 school years he served as an assistant coach to Navy's women's basketball team. In 2005, Booker was recruited by Tulsa men's basketball head coach Doug Wojcik to be an assistant. Wojcik was an assistant coach for Navy and had recruited Booker to play for them. Booker spent two seasons at Tulsa before leaving basketball to pursue a career in business.
