= List of VMI Keydets basketball seasons =

The following is a list of VMI Keydets basketball seasons. VMI competes in the Southern Conference of the NCAA's Division I. Since 1981, the Keydets have played their home games out of 5,800–seat Cameron Hall.

The history of VMI basketball dates back to 1908, with the formation of the school's first team. The Keydets played as an independent until 1918, when they joined the now-defunct South Atlantic Intercollegiate Athletic Association. Following the league's demise, VMI returned to playing as an independent before joining the Southern Conference in 1924, where they would remain for the next eighty years. VMI left the SoCon for the Big South Conference in 2003, but returned to the league in 2014.

VMI has won three conference championships in their history, all of them while in the Southern Conference. The first came in 1964 under head coach Weenie Miller, a season in which the Keydets upset Lefty Driesell and his top-ranked Davidson Wildcats in the SoCon Tournament. Later in 1976, VMI, led by Hall of Fame forward Ron Carter, achieved a 22–10 record en route to a conference championship and upset run to the Elite 8 round of the NCAA tournament. The Keydets advanced to the Sweet 16 the following year in 1977, and have not been to the NCAA tournament since. In 2014, however, VMI accepted an invitation to participate in the 2014 CollegeInsider.com Postseason Tournament, where they advanced to the semifinals before falling to Yale. The Keydets also accepted an invitational to the College Basketball Invitational in 2022.

== Seasons ==
Conference regular season champion^{†}	Conference tournament champion^{‡}	Postseason bid^{^}	Shared standing

Season	Head coach	Conference	Season results					Tournament results		Final poll	
Season	Head coach	Conference	Overall		Conference			Conference	Postseason	AP	Coaches'
Season	Head coach	Conference	Wins	Losses	Wins	Losses	Finish (Note: The Southern Conference used a divisional format from 1994–95 until 2012–13. The Big South also did this from 2012 to 2014.)	Conference	Postseason	AP	Coaches'
VMI Keydets
1908–09	Pete Krebs	Independent	3	3	—	—	—	—	—	—	—
1909–10	F. J. Pratt	Independent	2	5	—	—	—	—	—	—	—
1910–11	J. Mitchell	Independent	3	5	—	—	—	—	—	—	—
1911–12	Alpha Brummage	Independent	6	5	—	—	—	—	—	—	—
1912–13	Alpha Brummage	Independent	8	4	—	—	—	—	—	—	—
1913–14	W. C. Raftery	Independent	6	6	—	—	—	—	—	—	—
1914–15	Frank Gorton	Independent	8	2	—	—	—	—	—	—	—
1915–16	Frank Gorton	Independent	9	3	—	—	—	—	—	—	—
1916–17	Frank Gorton	Independent	9	5	—	—	—	—	—	—	—
1917–18	Earl Abell	Independent	6	6	—	—	—	—	—	—	—
1918–19	Earl Abell	Independent	8	6	—	—	—	—	—	—	—
1919–20	Pinky Spruhan	Independent	11	1	—	—	—	—	—	—	—
1920–21	Pinky Spruhan	Independent	16	1	—	—	—	—	—	—	—
1921–22	Pinky Spruhan	Independent	11	7	—	—	—	—	—	—	—
1922–23	W. C. Raftery	Independent	8	6	—	—	—	—	—	—	—
1923–24	W. C. Raftery	Independent	9	5	—	—	—	Quarterfinal	—	—	—
1924–25	W. C. Raftery	Independent	6	5	—	—	—	Quarterfinal	—	—	—
1925–26	W. C. Raftery	Southern	7	8	3	5	13th	Quarterfinal	—	—	—
1926–27	W. C. Raftery	Southern	3	12	0	7	21st	Quarterfinal	—	—	—
1927–28	W. C. Raftery	Southern	7	6	5	5	9th	Quarterfinal	—	—	—
1928–29	W. C. Raftery	Southern	6	7	1	7	22nd	—	—	—	—
1929–30	W. C. Raftery	Southern	4	10	2	6	17th	Quarterfinal	—	—	—
1930–31	W. C. Raftery	Southern	4	12	2	8	20th	—	—	—	—
1931–32	W. C. Raftery	Southern	0	14	0	9	23rd	—	—	—	—
1932–33	W. C. Raftery	Southern	4	11	2	8	8th	—	—	—	—
1933–34	W. C. Raftery	Southern	4	10	3	6	7th	Quarterfinal	—	—	—
1934–35	Frank Summers	Southern	3	14	2	9	9th	Quarterfinal	—	—	—
1935–36	Frank Summers	Southern	3	14	0	10	10th	—	—	—	—
1936–37	Allison Hubert	Southern	6	11	5	11	13th	—	—	—	—
1937–38	Albert Elmore	Southern	4	11	2	7	13th	—	—	—	—
1938–39	Jimmy Walker	Southern	7	10	6	6	9th	Quarterfinal	—	—	—
1939–40	Jimmy Walker	Southern	3	12	2	9	14th	—	—	—	—
1940–41	Jimmy Walker	Southern	10	6	8	4	5th	Semifinal	—	—	—
1941–42	Jimmy Walker	Southern	7	11	5	9	10th	—	—	—	—
1942–43	Allison Hubert	Southern	8	8	7	5	7th	Quarterfinal	—	—	—
1943–44	Joe Daher	Southern	0	14	0	5	12th	—	—	—	—
1944–45	Joe Daher	Southern	2	10	1	4	12th	—	—	—	—
1945–46	Jay McWilliams	Southern	1	10	1	6	14th	—	—	—	—
1946–47	Lloyd Roberts	Southern	4	15	1	11	15th	—	—	—	—
1947–48	Frank Summers	Southern	3	17	1	12	16th	—	—	—	—
1948–49	Frank Summers	Southern	3	16	3	8	15th	—	—	—	—
1949–50	Bill O'Hara	Southern	4	17	2	11	16th	—	—	—	—
1950–51	Bill O'Hara	Southern	3	18	3	11	13th	—	—	—	—
1951–52	Bill O'Hara	Southern	3	21	2	13	16th	—	—	—	—
1952–53	Chuck Noe	Southern	5	19	1	14	15th	—	—	—	—
1953–54	Chuck Noe	Southern	11	12	6	7	6th	Quarterfinal	—	—	—
1954–55	Chuck Noe	Southern	8	15	4	9	8th	Quarterfinal	—	—	—
1955–56	Jack Null	Southern	4	19	3	11	9th	—	—	—	—
1956–57	Jack Null	Southern	4	22	1	13	10th	—	—	—	—
1957–58	Jack Null	Southern	4	17	1	12	10th	—	—	—	—
1958–59	Weenie Miller	Southern	5	13	2	11	9th	—	—	—	—
1959–60	Weenie Miller	Southern	4	16	3	11	7th	Quarterfinal	—	—	—
1960–61	Weenie Miller	Southern	5	17	3	11	8th	Quarterfinal	—	—	—
1961–62	Weenie Miller	Southern	9	11	6	8	6th	Semifinal	—	—	—
1962–63	Weenie Miller	Southern	6	15	6	10	7th	Quarterfinal	—	—	—
1963–64	Weenie Miller	Southern	12	12	7	7	4th	Champions^{‡}	NCAA First Round^{^}	—	—
1964–65	Gary McPherson	Southern	8	13	5	9	8th	Quarterfinal	—	—	—
1965–66	Gary McPherson	Southern	5	18	5	11	7th	Quarterfinal	—	—	—
1966–67	Gary McPherson	Southern	5	16	4	12	9th	—	—	—	—
1967–68	Gary McPherson	Southern	9	12	8	7	4th	Quarterfinal	—	—	—
1968–69	Gary McPherson	Southern	5	18	3	11	8th	Quarterfinal	—	—	—
1969–70	Mike Schuler	Southern	6	19	3	10	8th	Quarterfinal	—	—	—
1970–71	Mike Schuler	Southern	1	25	1	11	7th	Quarterfinal	—	—	—
1971–72	Mike Schuler	Southern	6	19	2	10	7th	Quarterfinal	—	—	—
1972–73	Bill Blair	Southern	7	19	3	9	8th	Quarterfinal	—	—	—
1973–74	Bill Blair	Southern	6	18	3	9	7th	Quarterfinal	—	—	—
1974–75	Bill Blair	Southern	13	13	6	6	5th	Semifinal	—	—	—
1975–76	Bill Blair	Southern	22	10	9	3	1st	Champions^{‡}	NCAA Elite 8^{^}	—	—
1976–77	Charlie Schmaus	Southern	26	4	8	2	1st	Champions^{‡}	NCAA Sweet Sixteen^{^}	20	—
1977–78	Charlie Schmaus	Southern	21	7	7	3	2nd	Semifinal	—	—	—
1978–79	Charlie Schmaus	Southern	12	15	2	8	8th	Quarterfinal	—	—	—
1979–80	Charlie Schmaus	Southern	11	16	6	10	6th	Quarterfinal	—	—	—
1980–81	Charlie Schmaus	Southern	4	23	3	13	8th	Quarterfinal	—	—	—
1981–82	Charlie Schmaus	Southern	1	25	1	15	9th	—	—	—	—
1982–83	Marty Fletcher	Southern	2	25	1	15	9th	—	—	—	—
1983–84	Marty Fletcher	Southern	8	19	4	12	9th	—	—	—	—
1984–85	Marty Fletcher	Southern	16	14	7	9	5th	Final	—	—	—
1985–86	Marty Fletcher	Southern	11	17	5	11	7th	Quarterfinal	—	—	—
1986–87	Joe Cantafio	Southern	11	17	5	11	6th	Quarterfinal	—	—	—
1987–88	Joe Cantafio	Southern	13	17	6	10	7th	Final	—	—	—
1988–89	Joe Cantafio	Southern	11	17	5	9	7th	Quarterfinal	—	—	—
1989–90	Joe Cantafio	Southern	14	15	7	7	4th	Semifinal	—	—	—
1990–91	Joe Cantafio	Southern	10	18	5	9	6th	Quarterfinal	—	—	—
1991–92	Joe Cantafio	Southern	10	18	3	11	6th	Quarterfinal	—	—	—
1992–93	Joe Cantafio	Southern	5	22	3	15	9th	First Round	—	—	—
1993–94	Joe Cantafio	Southern	11	17	5	11	10th	Quarterfinal	—	—	—
1994–95	Bart Bellairs	Southern	10	17	6	8	4th (North)	First Round	—	—	—
1995–96	Bart Bellairs	Southern	18	10	10	4	2nd (North)	Semifinal	—	—	—
1996–97	Bart Bellairs	Southern	12	16	7	7	4th (North)	Quarterfinal	—	—	—
1997–98	Bart Bellairs	Southern	14	13	8	7	3rd (North)	Quarterfinal	—	—	—
1998–99	Bart Bellairs	Southern	12	15	9	7	3rd (North)	First Round	—	—	—
1999–00	Bart Bellairs	Southern	6	23	1	15	6th (North)	First Round	—	—	—
2000–01	Bart Bellairs	Southern	9	19	5	11	5th (North)	First Round	—	—	—
2001–02	Bart Bellairs	Southern	10	18	5	11	5th (North)	First Round	—	—	—
2002–03	Bart Bellairs	Southern	10	20	3	13	8th	Semifinal	—	—	—
2003–04	Bart Bellairs	Big South	6	22	4	12	8th	Quarterfinal	—	—	—
2004–05	Bart Bellairs	Big South	9	18	3	13	9th	—	—	—	—
2005–06	Duggar Baucom	Big South	7	20	2	14	9th	—	—	—	—
2006–07	Duggar Baucom	Big South	14	19	5	9	6th	Final	—	—	—
2007–08	Duggar Baucom	Big South	14	15	6	8	5th	Quarterfinal	—	—	—
2008–09	Duggar Baucom	Big South	24	8	13	5	2nd	Final	—	—	—
2009–10	Duggar Baucom	Big South	10	19	5	13	8th	Quarterfinal	—	—	—
2010–11	Duggar Baucom	Big South	18	13	10	8	4th	Semifinal	—	—	—
2011–12	Duggar Baucom	Big South	17	16	8	10	7th	Final	—	—	—
2012–13	Duggar Baucom	Big South	14	17	8	8	2nd (North)	Semifinal	—	—	—
2013–14	Duggar Baucom	Big South	22	13	11	5	2nd (North)	Semifinal	CIT Semifinals^{^}	—	—
2014–15	Duggar Baucom	Southern	11	19	7	11	6th	Quarterfinal	—	—	—
2015–16	Dan Earl	Southern	9	21	4	14	9th	First Round	—	—	—
2016–17	Dan Earl	Southern	6	24	3	15	10th	First Round	—	—	—
2017–18	Dan Earl	Southern	9	21	4	14	9th	First Round	—	—	—
2018–19	Dan Earl	Southern	11	21	4	14	8th	Quarterfinals	—	—	—
2019–20	Dan Earl	Southern	9	24	3	15	9th	Quarterfinals	—	—	—
2020–21	Dan Earl	Southern	13	12	7	7	6th	Semifinals	—	—	—
2021–22	Dan Earl	Southern	16	16	9	9	5th	Quarterfinals	CBI First Round^{^}	—	—
2022–23	Andrew Wilson	Southern	7	25	2	16	10th	First Round	—	—	—
2023–24	Andrew Wilson	Southern	4	28	1	17	10th	First Round	—	—	—
2024–25	Andrew Wilson	Southern	15	19	7	11	7th	Semifinals	—	—	—

== Postseason results ==
The Keydets have appeared in three NCAA Tournaments, all by way of winning their conference tournament and the subsequent automatic bid. VMI made two upset tournament runs in 1976 and 1977 which culminated in Elite Eight and Sweet Sixteen appearances, respectively. After a 37-year postseason drought, VMI accepted an invitation to participate in the 2014 CollegeInsider.com Postseason Tournament. A field of 32 teams, the Keydets won three games and lost in the semifinal round of the tournament. VMI returned to postseason play in 2022, accepting a bid to the College Basketball Invitational.

Tournament	Seed	Results	Reference
1964; NCAA Tournament	—	NCAA First Round; Lost First Round vs. Princeton, 60–86	
1976; NCAA Tournament	—	NCAA Elite 8 Won First Round vs. Tennessee, 81–75; Won Semifinals vs. DePaul, 71–66 OT; Lost Final vs. Rutgers, 75–91	
1977; NCAA Tournament	—	NCAA Sweet 16; Won First Round vs. Duquesne, 73–66; Lost Semifinals vs. Kentucky, 78–93	
2014; CIT	—	CIT Semifinals; Won First Round vs. Canisius, 111–100; Won Second Round vs. IPFW, 106–95; Won Quarterfinals vs. Ohio, 92–90; Lost Semifinals vs. Yale, 62–75	
2022; CBI	8	CBI First Round; Lost First Round vs. UNCW, 78–93	

== Statistics ==
Statistics correct as of the end of the 2024–25 NCAA Division I men's basketball season.

Coaches	Overall			Conference			Postseason		
Coaches	Wins	Losses	Win%	Wins	Losses	Win%	Wins	Losses	Win%
Pete Krebs	3	3	.500						
F. J. Pratt	2	5	.286						
J. Mitchell	3	5	.375						
Alpha Brummage	14	9	.609						
W. C. Raftery	68	112	.378	18	61	.228			
Frank Gorton	26	10	.722						
Earl Abell	14	12	.538						
Pinky Spruhan	38	9	.809						
Frank Summers	12	61	.164						
Allison Hubert	14	19	.424	12	16	.429			
Albert Elmore	4	11	.267	2	7	.222			
Jimmy Walker	27	39	.409	21	28	.429			
Joe Daher	2	24	.077	1	9	.100			
Jay McWilliams	1	10	.091	1	6	.143			
Lloyd Roberts	4	15	.211	1	11	.083			
Bill O'Hara	10	56	.152	7	35	.167			
Chuck Noe	24	46	.300	11	30	.268			
Jack Null	12	58	.171	5	36	.122			
Weenie Miller	41	83	.331	27	58	.318	0	1	.000
Gary McPherson	32	77	.294	25	50	.333			
Mike Schuler	13	63	.171	6	31	.162			
Bill Blair	48	60	.444	21	27	.438	2	1	.667
Charlie Schmaus	75	90	.455	27	51	.346	1	1	.500
Marty Fletcher	37	75	.330	17	47	.266			
Joe Cantafio	79	147	.350	36	88	.290			
Bart Bellairs	116	191	.378	61	108	.361			
Duggar Baucom	151	159	.487	75	91	.452	3	1	.750
Dan Earl	73	139	.344	34	88	.279	0	1	.000
Andrew Wilson	26	72	.265	10	44	.185			
All-time record	975	1,655	.371	427	956	.309	6	7	.462
