= List of VMI Keydets head basketball coaches =

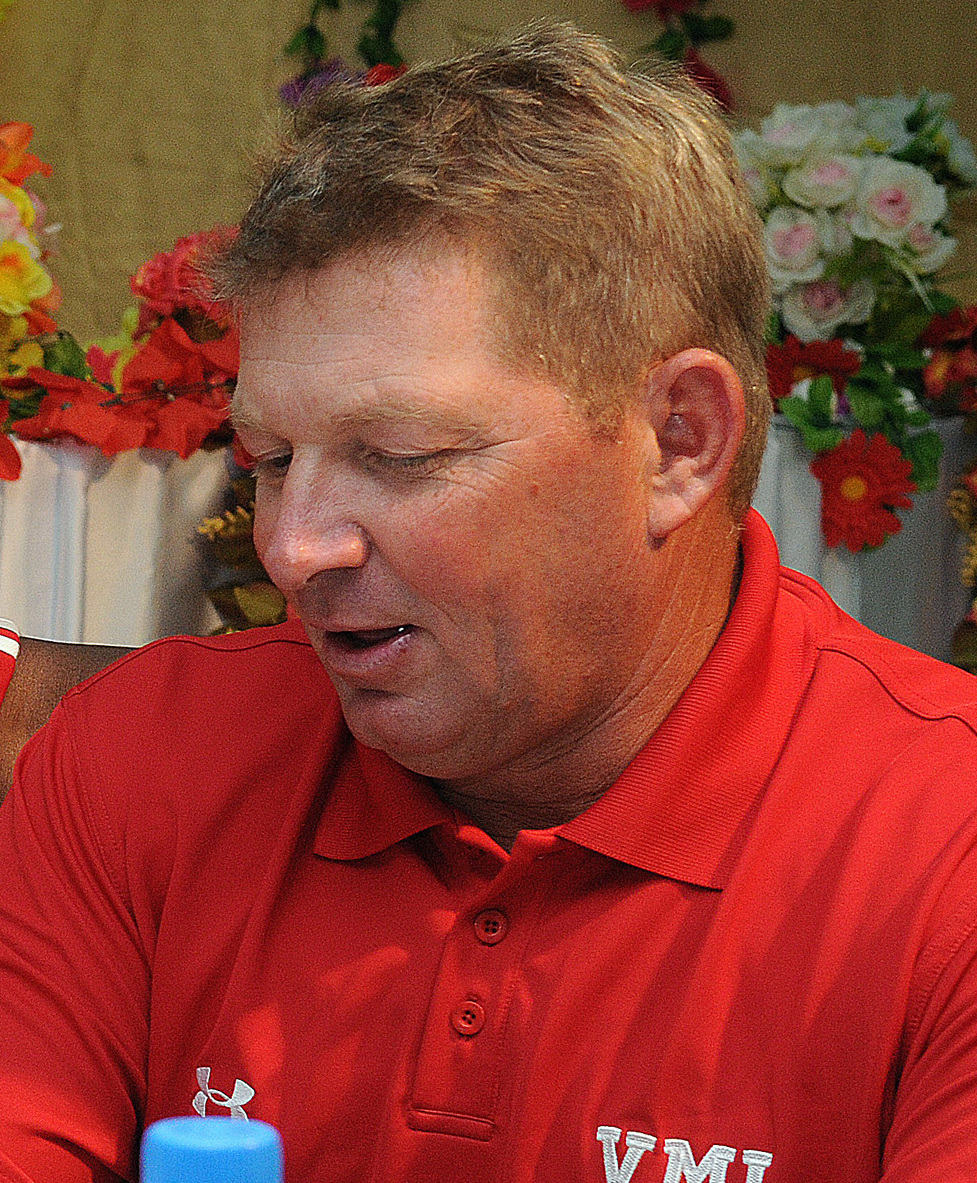
Duggar Baucom (2005–15) is the school's all-time wins leader.

The VMI Keydets basketball program competes in the Southern Conference of the National Collegiate Athletic Association's Division I, representing the Virginia Military Institute in Lexington, Virginia. The program has had 26 head coaches since its inception in 1908–09.

The school's first team was led by Pete Krebs, who guided the Keydets to a 3–3 record in his only season as head coach. After 16 years playing as an independent, VMI joined the Southern Conference in 1924, where they would play for nearly eighty years until joining the Big South Conference in 2003. VMI has had only three NCAA tournament appearances in hits history, the first of which came in 1964 under L. F. "Weenie" Miller. VMI was eliminated in the first round with an 86–60 loss to Princeton.

VMI's most successful run occurred in the late 1970s where Bill Blair led the Keydets to wins over Tennessee and DePaul after a 22–10 campaign in 1975–76. The Keydets finally fell to Rutgers in the Elite 8, 91–75. After Blair departed for Colorado, Charlie Schmaus took over and, with a roster of VMI Hall of Famer Ron Carter alongside Will Bynum, Dave Montgomery, and John Krovic, guided VMI to its best season in school history with a 26–4 record and their third NCAA tournament appearance, where they defeated Duquesne 73–66, and lost to Kentucky in the following round by a score of 93–78. At the season's end, VMI was ranked #20 in the AP Poll, the school's first and only final AP ranking to this date.

Duggar Baucom, who led the Keydets from 2005 to 2015, is the school's all-time leader in wins with 151 total victories, and also holds the program record for conference wins with 73. He was replaced by Dan Earl, who served as head coach of the Keydets for seven years from 2015 to 2022.

VMI's current head coach is Andrew Wilson, who was hired prior to the 2022–23 season.

== Key ==
General
#	Number of coaches
GC	Games coached
^{†}	Elected to the Basketball Hall of Fame
BT	Basketball Times Coaches of the Year
NCHOF	National Collegiate Basketball Hall of Fame

Overall
W	Wins
L	Losses
W%	Winning percentage

Conference
CW	Wins
CL	Losses
C%	Winning percentage
Reg. Champs	Regular Season Championships
Tourn. Champs	Tournament Championships

== Coaches ==
Statistics correct as of the end of the 2023–24 NCAA Division I men's basketball season.

#	Name	Season(s)	GC	W	L	W%	CW	CL	C%	Reg. Champs	Tourn. Champs	Awards
1	Pete Krebs	1908–09	6	3	3	.500	—	—	—	—	—	—
2	F. J. Pratt	1909–10	7	2	5	.286	—	—	—	—	—	—
3	J. Mitchell	1910–11	8	3	5	.375	—	—	—	—	—	—
4	Alpha Brumage	1911–1913	23	14	9	.609	—	—	—	—	—	—
5	W. C. Raftery	1913–14, 1922–34	180	68	112	.378	18	61	.228	—	—	—
6	Frank Gorton	1914–17	36	26	10	.722	—	—	—	—	—	—
7	Earl Abell	1917–19	26	14	12	.538	—	—	—	—	—	—
8	Pinky Spruhan	1919–22	47	38	9	.809	—	—	—	—	—	—
9	Frank Summers	1934–36, 1947–49	73	12	61	.164	6	39	.133	—	—	—
10	Allison Hubert	1936–37, 1942–43	33	14	19	.424	12	16	.429	—	—	—
11	Albert Elmore	1937–38	15	4	11	.267	2	7	.222	—	—	—
12	Jimmy Walker	1938–42	66	27	39	.409	21	28	.429	—	—	—
13	Joe Daher	1943–45	26	2	24	.077	1	9	.100	—	—	—
14	Jay McWilliams	1945–46	11	1	10	.091	1	6	.143	—	—	—
15	Lloyd Roberts	1946–47	19	4	15	.211	1	11	.083	—	—	—
16	Bill O'Hara	1949–52	66	10	56	.152	7	35	.167	—	—	—
17	Chuck Noe	1952–55	68	24	46	.343	11	30	.268	—	—	—
18	Jack Null	1955–58	70	12	58	.171	5	36	.122	—	—	—
19	Weenie Miller	1958–64	124	41	83	.331	27	58	.318	—	1	—
20	Gary McPherson	1964–69	109	32	77	.294	25	50	.333	—	—	—
21	Mike Schuler	1969–72	76	13	63	.171	6	31	.162	—	—	—
22	Bill Blair	1972–76	108	48	60	.444	21	27	.438	—	1	—
23	Charlie Schmaus	1976–82	165	75	90	.455	27	51	.346	—	1	—
24	Marty Fletcher	1982–86	112	37	75	.330	17	47	.266	—	—	—
25	Joe Cantafio	1986–94	226	79	147	.350	36	88	.290	—	—	—
26	Bart Bellairs	1994–05	307	116	191	.378	61	108	.361	—	—	—
27	Duggar Baucom	2005–2015	310	151	159	.487	73	101	.420	—	—	—
28	Dan Earl	2015–22	212	73	139	.344	34	88	.279	—	—	—
29	Andrew Wilson	2022–	64	11	53	.172	3	33	.083	—	—	—
