= Louisiana Ragin' Cajuns men's basketball statistical leaders =

The Louisiana Ragin' Cajuns men's basketball statistical leaders are individual statistical leaders of the Louisiana Ragin' Cajuns men's basketball program in various categories, including points, rebounds, assists, steals, and blocks. Within those areas, the lists identify single-game, single-season, and career leaders. The Ragin' Cajuns represent the University of Louisiana at Lafayette in the NCAA's Sun Belt Conference.

== Background ==
Louisiana began competing in intercollegiate basketball in 1911. However, the school's record book does not generally list records from before the 1950s, as records from before this period are often incomplete and inconsistent. Since scoring was much lower in this era, and teams played much fewer games during a typical season, it is likely that few or no players from this era would appear on these lists anyway.

The NCAA did not officially record assists as a stat until the 1983–84 season, and blocks and steals until the 1985–86 season, but Louisiana's record books includes players in these stats before these seasons. These lists are updated through the end of the 2023–24 season.

== Scoring ==
Career
| Rk | Player | Points | Seasons |
|---|---|---|---|
| 1 | Dwight Lamar | 3,493 | 1969–70 1970–71 1971–72 1972–73 |
| 2 | Andrew Toney | 2,526 | 1976–77 1977–78 1978–79 1979–80 |
| 3 | Shawn Long | 2,342 | 2012–13 2013–14 2014–15 2015–16 |
| 4 | Kevin Brooks | 2,294 | 1987–88 1988–89 1989–90 1990–91 |
| 5 | Marv Winkler | 2,128 | 1966–67 1967–68 1968–69 1969–70 |
| 6 | Jerry Flake | 2,058 | 1965–66 1966–67 1967–68 1968–69 |
| 7 | Graylin Warner | 1,762 | 1980–81 1981–82 1982–83 1983–84 |
| 8 | Roy Ebron | 1,683 | 1970–71 1971–72 1972–73 |
| 9 | Michael Allen | 1,673 | 1991–92 1992–93 1993–94 |
| 10 | Ed McCauley | 1,596 | 1951–52 1952–53 1953–54 1954–55 |

Season
| Rk | Player | Points | Season |
|---|---|---|---|
| 1 | Dwight Lamar | 1,054 | 1971–72 |
| 2 | Dwight Lamar | 1,044 | 1970–71 |
| 3 | Dwight Lamar | 808 | 1972–73 |
| 4 | Sydney Grider | 739 | 1989–90 |
| 5 | Dean Church | 701 | 1964–65 |
| 6 | Michael Allen | 682 | 1993–94 |
| 7 | Sydney Grider | 680 | 1988–89 |
| 8 | Elfrid Payton | 672 | 2013–14 |
| 9 | Roy Ebron | 666 | 1971–72 |
| 10 | Marv Winkler | 665 | 1969–70 |

Single game
| Rk | Player | Points | Season | Opponent |
|---|---|---|---|---|
| 1 | Dwight Lamar | 62 | 1970–71 | Northeast Louisiana |
| 2 | Dwight Lamar | 51 | 1971–72 | Lamar |
| | Dwight Lamar | 51 | 1971–72 | Louisiana Tech |
| 4 | Dwight Lamar | 50 | 1972–73 | Houston Baptist |
| 5 | Dwight Lamar | 48 | 1971–72 | Louisiana Tech |
| 6 | Andrew Toney | 46 | 1979–80 | Auburn |
| | Andrew Toney | 46 | 1978–79 | Pepperdine |
| | Andrew Toney | 46 | 1977–78 | McNeese State |
| | Dwight Lamar | 46 | 1971–72 | Eastern Kentucky |
| | Dwight Lamar | 46 | 1970–71 | Oklahoma State |

== Rebounds ==
Career
| Rk | Player | Rebounds | Seasons |
|---|---|---|---|
| 1 | Shawn Long | 1,447 | 2012–13 2013–14 2014–15 2015–16 |
| 2 | Bryce Washington | 1,102 | 2014–15 2015–16 2016–17 2017–18 |
| 3 | Roy Ebron | 1,064 | 1970–71 1971–72 1972–73 |
| 4 | Marcus Stokes | 1,046 | 1988–89 1989–90 1990–91 1991–92 |
| 5 | Dion Brown | 926 | 1980–81 1981–82 1982–83 1983–84 |
| 6 | Payton Townsend | 896 | 1968–69 1969–70 1970–71 1971–72 |
| 7 | Reginald Poole | 842 | 1994–95 1995–96 1996–97 1998–99 |
| 8 | Fred Saunders | 780 | 1970–71 1971–72 1972–73 |
| 9 | Elvin Ivory | 768 | 1966–67 1967–68 |
| 10 | Dion Rainey | 749 | 1976–77 1977–78 1978–79 1979–80 |

Season
| Rk | Player | Rebounds | Season |
|---|---|---|---|
| 1 | Elvin Ivory | 500 | 1966–67 |
| 2 | Shawn Long | 411 | 2015–16 |
| | Roy Ebron | 411 | 1971–72 |
| 4 | Marcus Stokes | 370 | 1991–92 |
| 5 | Bryce Washington | 369 | 2016–17 |
| 6 | Roy Ebron | 357 | 1972–73 |
| 7 | Bryce Washington | 356 | 2017–18 |
| 8 | Shawn Long | 353 | 2013–14 |
| 9 | Shawn Long | 346 | 2014–15 |
| 10 | Shawn Long | 337 | 2012–13 |

Single game
| Rk | Player | Rebounds | Season | Opponent |
|---|---|---|---|---|
| 1 | Roy Ebron | 28 | 1971–72 | Northwestern State |
| 2 | Roy Ebron | 24 | 1971–72 | ULM |
| | Roy Ebron | 24 | 1971–72 | McNeese State |
| | Mike Wallace | 24 | 1960–61 | Northwestern State |
| | Dallas Wolf | 24 | 1954–55 | Centenary |
| 6 | Shawn Long | 22 | 2014–15 | South Alabama |
| | Lonnie Thomas | 22 | 1999–00 | Siena |
| 8 | Bryce Washington | 21 | 2016–17 | ULM |
| | Reginald Poole | 21 | 1998–99 | Hawai'i |
| | Dion Brown | 21 | 1981–82 | McNeese State |
| | Roy Ebron | 21 | 1972–73 | UT Arlington |

== Assists ==
Career
| Rk | Player | Assists | Seasons |
|---|---|---|---|
| 1 | Aaron Mitchell | 674 | 1987–88 1988–89 1989–90 1990–91 |
| 2 | Marv Winkler | 580 | 1966–67 1967–68 1968–69 1969–70 |
| 3 | Ted Lyles | 537 | 1975–76 1976–77 1977–78 1978–79 |
| 4 | Dwight Lamar | 520 | 1969–70 1970–71 1971–72 1972–73 |
| 5 | Elfrid Payton | 486 | 2011–12 2012–13 2013–14 |
| 6 | Eric Mouton | 471 | 1987–88 1988–89 1990–91 1991–92 |
| 7 | Marcus Stroman | 427 | 2017–18 2018–19 |
| 8 | Kenneth Lawrence | 407 | 1999–00 2000–01 2001–02 2002–03 |
| 9 | George Almones | 402 | 1982–83 1983–84 1984–85 |
| 10 | Johnny Collins | 399 | 1981–82 1982–83 |

Season
| Rk | Player | Assists | Season |
|---|---|---|---|
| 1 | Aaron Mitchell | 264 | 1989–90 |
| 2 | Johnny Collins | 234 | 1981–82 |
| 3 | Carl Jordan | 225 | 1979–80 |
| 4 | Marcus Stroman | 214 | 2018–19 |
| 5 | Marcus Stroman | 213 | 2017–18 |
| 6 | Elfrid Payton | 208 | 2013–14 |
| 7 | Themus Fulks | 205 | 2022–23 |
| 8 | Elfrid Payton | 181 | 2012–13 |
| 9 | George Almones | 178 | 1983–84 |
| 10 | Aaron Mitchell | 172 | 1988–89 |

Single game
| Rk | Player | Assists | Season | Opponent |
|---|---|---|---|---|
| 1 | Ted Lyles | 18 | 1975–76 | Houston Baptist |
| 2 | Brad Boyd | 17 | 2001–02 | North Texas |
| 3 | Marcus Stroman | 15 | 2017–18 | Georgia State |
| | Aaron Mitchell | 15 | 1989–90 | Chattanooga |
| | Aaron Mitchell | 15 | 1989–90 | Appalachian State |
| | Marv Winkler | 15 | 1966–67 | Northwestern State |
| 7 | Aaron Mitchell | 14 | 1989–90 | Tennessee Tech |
| | Brian Jolivette | 14 | 1985–86 | ULM |
| | Alford Turner | 14 | 1980–81 | UT Pan American |
| | Carl Jordan | 14 | 1979–80 | UT Pan American |

== Steals ==
Career
| Rk | Player | Steals | Seasons |
|---|---|---|---|
| 1 | Elfrid Payton | 197 | 2011–12 2012–13 2013–14 |
| 2 | Chris Manuel | 184 | 1994–95 1995–96 1996–97 1997–98 |
| 3 | Shawn Griggs | 179 | 1992–93 1993–94 |
| 4 | Aaron Mitchell | 167 | 1987–88 1988–89 1989–90 1990–91 |
| 5 | Reginald Poole | 157 | 1994–95 1995–96 1996–97 1998–99 |
| 6 | Graylin Warner | 153 | 1980–81 1981–82 1982–83 1983–84 |
| 7 | Dwayne Mitchell | 148 | 2003–04 2004–05 2005–06 |
| | Kenneth Lawrence | 148 | 1999–00 2000–01 2001–02 2002–03 |
| | Kasey Shepherd | 148 | 2012–13 2013–14 2014–15 2015–16 |
| 10 | George Almones | 145 | 1982–83 1983–84 1984–85 |

Season
| Rk | Player | Steals | Season |
|---|---|---|---|
| 1 | Shawn Griggs | 120 | 1993–94 |
| 2 | Johnny Collins | 96 | 1981–82 |
| 3 | Elfrid Payton | 80 | 2013–14 |
| | Elfrid Payton | 80 | 2012–13 |
| 5 | Brian Hamilton | 75 | 2004–05 |
| 6 | Aaron Mitchell | 68 | 1990–91 |
| | Alford Turner | 68 | 1981–82 |
| | Mylik Wilson | 68 | 2019–20 |
| | Orien Greene | 68 | 2004–05 |
| 10 | Marcus Stroman | 66 | 2018–19 |

Single game
| Rk | Player | Steals | Season | Opponent |
|---|---|---|---|---|
| 1 | Ron Bailey | 8 | 1994–95 | Western Kentucky |
| | Shawn Griggs | 8 | 1993–94 | Arkansas State |
| | Shawn Griggs | 8 | 1993–94 | UT Pan American |

== Blocks ==
Career
| Rk | Player | Blocks | Seasons |
|---|---|---|---|
| 1 | Shawn Long | 273 | 2012–13 2013–14 2014–15 2015–16 |
| 2 | Michael Southall | 258 | 2001–02 2002–03 2005–06 |
| 3 | Reginald Poole | 169 | 1994–95 1995–96 1996–97 1998–99 |
| 4 | JaKeenan Gant | 156 | 2017–18 2018–19 |
| 5 | Graylin Warner | 138 | 1980–81 1981–82 1982–83 1983–84 |
| 6 | Tyren Johnson | 120 | 2006–07 2007–08 2008–09 2009–10 |
| 7 | Theo Akwuba | 118 | 2020–21 2021–22 |
| 8 | Marvin Lancaster | 110 | 1986–87 1988–89 |
| 9 | Bryce Washington | 88 | 2014–15 2015–16 2016–17 2017–18 |
| 10 | Marcus Stokes | 85 | 1988–89 1989–90 1990–91 1991–92 |

Season
| Rk | Player | Blocks | Season |
|---|---|---|---|
| 1 | Michael Southall | 97 | 2001–02 |
| 2 | Michael Southall | 93 | 2005–06 |
| 3 | Shawn Long | 91 | 2013–14 |
| 4 | JaKeenan Gant | 82 | 2018–19 |
| 5 | JaKeenan Gant | 74 | 2017–18 |
| 6 | Kadeem Coleby | 73 | 2011–12 |
| 7 | Marvin Lancaster | 69 | 1988–89 |
| 8 | Theo Akwuba | 68 | 2020–21 |
| | Michael Southall | 68 | 2002–03 |
| 10 | Shawn Long | 65 | 2012–13 |

Single game
| Rk | Player | Blocks | Season | Opponent |
|---|---|---|---|---|
| 1 | Michael Southall | 11 | 2005–06 | North Texas |
