= 1991–92 Western Kentucky Hilltoppers basketball team =

American college basketball season

1991–92 Western Kentucky Hilltoppers basketball

Aloha Invitational Champion

NIT Tournament, First Round
- Conference: Sun Belt Conference
- Record: 21–11 (10–6 Sun Belt)
- Head coach: Ralph Willard
- Home arena: E. A. Diddle Arena

1991–92 Sun Belt Conference men's basketball standings
	Conf.				Overall
Team	W		L	PCT	W		L	PCT
Louisiana Tech	12	–	4	.750	22	–	9	.710
SW Louisiana †	12	–	4	.750	21	–	11	.656
Arkansas State	11	–	5	.688	17	–	11	.607
Western Kentucky	10	–	6	.625	21	–	11	.656
South Alabama	9	–	7	.563	14	–	14	.500
Arkansas-Little Rock	8	–	8	.500	17	–	13	.567
New Orleans	9	–	7	.563	17	–	15	.531
Lamar	7	–	9	.438	12	–	19	.387
Jacksonville	6	–	10	.375	12	–	17	.414
UCF	3	–	13	.188	10	–	18	.357
Texas-Rio Grande Valley	1	–	15	.063	3	–	26	.103
† 1992 Sun Belt Conference tournament winner Rankings from AP Poll

The 1991–92 Western Kentucky Hilltoppers men's basketball team represented Western Kentucky University during the 1991–92 NCAA Division I men's basketball season. The Hilltoppers were led by coach Ralph Willard and All-Sun Belt Conference player Jack Jennings. The team received a bid to the 1992 National Invitation Tournament.

== Schedule ==
Date time, TV	Rank^{#}	Opponent^{#}	Result	Record	Site city, state
Regular Season
11/27/1991*		Southern Illinois	L 64–73	0–1	E. A. Diddle Arena; Bowling Green, KY
11/30/1991*		Tennessee-Martin	W 75–61	1–1	E. A. Diddle Arena; Bowling Green, KY
12/2/1991*		Illinois-Chicago	W 80–78	2–1	E. A. Diddle Arena; Bowling Green, KY
12/4/1991*		at Eastern Kentucky	W 64–62	3–1	Alumni Coliseum; Richmond, KY
12/11/1991*		at Bowling Green	L 74–81	3–2	Anderson Arena; Bowling Green, OH
12/14/1991*		Austin Peay	W 86–67	4–2	E. A. Diddle Arena; Bowling Green, KY
12/19/1991*		Murray State	W 93–89	5–2	E. A. Diddle Arena; Bowling Green, KY
12/23/1991*		Bethune–Cookman	W 105–78	6–2	E. A. Diddle Arena; Bowling Green, KY
12/29/1991*		vs. Presbyterian; Aloha Invitational	W 82–64	7–2	Honolulu International Center; Honolulu, HI
12/30/1991*		vs. North Carolina State; Aloha Invitational	W 84–82	8–2	Honolulu International Center; Honolulu, HI
1/8/1992*		at Radford	W 81–78	9–2	Dedmon Center; Radford, VA
1/11/1992		at SW Louisiana	L 76–79	9–3 (0-1)	Cajundome; Lafayette, LA
1/18/1992		at Jacksonville	L 85–89 ^{OT}	9–4 (0-2)	Swisher Gymnasium; Jacksonville, FL
1/21/1992		Arkansas State	W 80–66	10–4 (1-2)	E. A. Diddle Arena; Bowling Green, KY
1/23/1992		South Alabama	L 72–84	10–5 (1-3)	E. A. Diddle Arena; Bowling Green, KY
1/24/1992		Arkansas–Little Rock	W 72–58	11–5 (2-3)	E. A. Diddle Arena; Bowling Green, KY
1/30/1992		at New Orleans	W 68–67	12–5 (3-3)	Lakefront Arena; New Orleans, LA
2/1/1992		Jacksonville	W 90–67	13–5 (4-3)	E. A. Diddle Arena; Bowling Green, KY
2/3/1992		at Louisiana Tech	L 79–91	13–6 (4-4)	Thomas Assembly Center; Ruston, LA
2/5/1992		at South Alabama	L 76–90	13–7 (4-5)	Mitchell Center; Mobile, AL
2/8/1992		Texas–Pan American	W 83–81	14–7 (5-5)	E. A. Diddle Arena; Bowling Green, KY
2/10/1992		at Central Florida	W 81–78 ^{OT}	15–7 (6-5)	The Venue at UCF; Orlando, FL
2/13/1992		Louisiana Tech	W 79–78 ^{OT}	16–7 (7-5)	E. A. Diddle Arena; Bowling Green, KY
2/15/1992*		at No. 19 Kentucky	L 83–93	16–8	Rupp Arena; Lexington, KY
2/20/1992		at Arkansas State	W 75–62	17–8 (8-5)	Convocation Center; Jonesboro, AR
2/22/1992		Lamar	W 103–88	18–8 (9-5)	E. A. Diddle Arena; Bowling Green, KY
2/27/1992		at Arkansas–Little Rock	L 78–82	18–9 (9-6)	Barton Coliseum; Little Rock, AR
2/29/1992		Central Florida	W 83–47	19–9 (10-6)	E. A. Diddle Arena; Bowling Green, KY
3/2/1992*		at VCU	W 77–75	20–9	Richmond Coliseum; Richmond, VA
1992 Sun Belt Conference men's basketball tournament
3/6/1992	(4)	vs. (5) South Alabama; Quarterfinals	W 95–94 ^{OT}	21–9	Mississippi Coast Coliseum; Biloxi, MS
3/7/1992	(4)	vs. (1) Louisiana Tech; Semifinals	L 60–74	21–10	Mississippi Coast Coliseum; Biloxi, MS
1992 National Invitation Tournament
3/18/1992*		at Kansas State; First Round	L 74–85	21–11	Bramlage Coliseum; Manhattan, KS
*Non-conference game. ^{#}Rankings from AP Poll (S#) during SBC Tournament is seed. (#) Tournament seedings in parentheses.
