= 1994 Sun Belt Conference men's basketball tournament =

- Classification: Division I
- Season: 1993–94
- Teams: 10
- Site: E. A. Diddle Arena; Bowling Green, KY
- Champions: Southwestern Louisiana (2nd title)
- Winning coach: Marty Fletcher (2nd title)
- MVP: Michael Allen (Southwestern Louisiana)

1993–94 Sun Belt Conference men's basketball standings
	Conf.				Overall
Team	W		L	PCT	W		L	PCT
Western Kentucky	14	–	4	.778	20	–	11	.645
SW Louisiana †	13	–	5	.722	22	–	8	.733
New Orleans	12	–	6	.667	20	–	10	.667
Jacksonville	11	–	7	.611	17	–	11	.607
Arkansas State	10	–	8	.556	15	–	12	.556
South Alabama	9	–	9	.500	13	–	14	.481
Texas-Pan American	9	–	9	.500	16	–	12	.571
Arkansas-Little Rock	6	–	12	.333	13	–	15	.464
Lamar	6	–	12	.333	10	–	17	.370
Louisiana Tech	0	–	18	.000	2	–	25	.074
† 1994 Sun Belt Conference tournament winner Rankings from AP Poll

The 1994 Sun Belt Conference men's basketball tournament was held March 4–7 at the E. A. Diddle Arena at Western Kentucky University in Bowling Green, Kentucky.

Southwestern Louisiana defeated top-seeded hosts Western Kentucky in the championship game, 78–72, to win their second Sun Belt men's basketball tournament. It was USL's second Sun Belt title in three years.

The Ragin' Cajuns, in turn, received an automatic bid to the 1994 NCAA tournament. Fellow Sun Belt member Western Kentucky joined them in the tournament, earning an at-large bid.

== Format ==
No teams left or joined the Sun Belt before the season, leaving conference membership fixed at ten teams.

With all teams participating in the tournament this year, the field increased from nine to ten teams. With all teams seeded based on regular-season conference records, the top six teams were all placed directly into the quarterfinal round while the four lowest-seeded teams were placed into the preliminary first round.

== Bracket ==
First round Friday, March 4
9	Lamar	71
8	Arkansas–Little Rock	78
7	Texas–Pan American	70
10	Louisiana Tech	65

Quarterfinals; Saturday, March 5
1	Western Kentucky	72
8	Arkansas–Little Rock	69
5	Arkansas State	55
4	Jacksonville	68
3	New Orleans	68
6	South Alabama	60
7	Texas–Pan American	60
2	SW Louisiana	81

Semifinals; Sunday, March 6
1	Western Kentucky	83
4	Jacksonville	72
3	New Orleans	55
2	SW Louisiana	59

Championship; Monday, March 7
1	Western Kentucky	72
2	SW Louisiana	78

== See also ==
- Sun Belt Conference women's basketball tournament
