= 1993–94 Western Kentucky Hilltoppers basketball team =

American college basketball season

1993–94 Western Kentucky Hilltoppers basketball

Sun Belt Conference Champion

NCAA Tournament, first round
- Conference: Sun Belt Conference
- Record: 20–11 (14–4 Sun Belt)
- Head coach: Ralph Willard
- Home arena: E. A. Diddle Arena

1993–94 Sun Belt Conference men's basketball standings
	Conf.				Overall
Team	W		L	PCT	W		L	PCT
Western Kentucky	14	–	4	.778	20	–	11	.645
SW Louisiana †	13	–	5	.722	22	–	8	.733
New Orleans	12	–	6	.667	20	–	10	.667
Jacksonville	11	–	7	.611	17	–	11	.607
Arkansas State	10	–	8	.556	15	–	12	.556
South Alabama	9	–	9	.500	13	–	14	.481
Texas-Pan American	9	–	9	.500	16	–	12	.571
Arkansas-Little Rock	6	–	12	.333	13	–	15	.464
Lamar	6	–	12	.333	10	–	17	.370
Louisiana Tech	0	–	18	.000	2	–	25	.074
† 1994 Sun Belt Conference tournament winner Rankings from AP Poll

The 1993–94 Western Kentucky Hilltoppers men's basketball team represented Western Kentucky University during the 1993–94 NCAA Division I men's basketball season. The Hilltoppers were led by coach Ralph Willard and future NBA player Chris Robinson. The team won the Sun Belt Conference Championship and were Sun Belt Basketball tournament runners-up. They received an at-large bid to the 1994 NCAA Division I men's basketball tournament.

Robinson made the All-Conference and SBC Tournament team.

== Schedule ==
Date time, TV	Rank^{#}	Opponent^{#}	Result	Record	Site city, state
Regular season
11/17/1993*		at No. 1 North Carolina; Preseason NIT	L 87–101	0–1	Dean Smith Center; Chapel Hill, NC
12/8/1993*		North Florida	W 129–91	1–1	E. A. Diddle Arena; Bowling Green, KY
12/11/1993*		Ball State	W 84–72	2–1	E. A. Diddle Arena; Bowling Green, KY
12/18/1993		at South Alabama	W 81–71	3–1 (1-0)	Mitchell Center; Mobile, AL
12/22/1993*	No. 25	at No. 11 Louisville	L 73–78 ^{OT}	3–2	Freedom Hall; Louisville, KY
12/27/1993*	No. 25	vs. Princeton; Hoosier Classic	W 59–45	4–2	Market Square Arena; Indianapolis, IN
12/28/1993*	No. 25	vs. No. 13 Indiana; Hoosier Classic	L 55–65	4–3	Market Square Arena; Indianapolis, IN
1/3/1994*	No. 25	at UAB	L 51–62	4–4	Bartow Arena; Birmingham, AL
1/6/1994		South Alabama	L 83–87	4–5 (1-1)	E. A. Diddle Arena; Bowling Green, KY
1/8/1994		Arkansas State	W 65–55	5–5 (2-1)	E. A. Diddle Arena; Bowling Green, KY
1/10/1994		Arkansas–Little Rock	W 83–78	6–5 (3-1)	E. A. Diddle Arena; Bowling Green, KY
1/13/1994		at New Orleans	L 74–79	6–6 (3-2)	Lakefront Arena; New Orleans, LA
1/15/1994		at Jacksonville	W 83–65	7–6 (4-2)	Swisher Gymnasium; Jacksonville, FL
1/22/1994		at Texas–Pan American	L 77–83	7–7 (4-3)	UTPA Fieldhouse; Edinburg, TX
1/24/1994		SW Louisiana	W 91–87	8–7 (5-3)	E. A. Diddle Arena; Bowling Green, KY
1/29/1994		Lamar	W 97–68	9–7 (6-3)	E. A. Diddle Arena; Bowling Green, KY
2/1/1994*		Oral Roberts	W 87–55	10–7	E. A. Diddle Arena; Bowling Green, KY
2/5/1994		at SW Louisiana	W 78–62	11–7 (7-3)	Cajundome; Lafayette, LA
2/10/1994		at Louisiana Tech	W 91–49	12–7 (8-3)	Thomas Assembly Center; Ruston, LA
2/12/1994		Jacksonville	L 77–84	12–8 (8-4)	E. A. Diddle Arena; Bowling Green, KY
2/15/1994*		Kansas State	L 68–71 ^{OT}	12–9	E. A. Diddle Arena; Bowling Green, KY
2/17/1994		at Arkansas–Little Rock	W 66–62	13–9 (9-4)	Barton Coliseum; Little Rock, AR
2/19/1994		at Arkansas State	W 73–51	14–9 (10-4)	Convocation Center; Jonesboro, AR
2/24/1994		at Lamar	W 85–83	15–9 (11-4)	Montagne Center; Beaumont, TX
2/26/1994		New Orleans	W 61–52	16–9 (12-4)	E. A. Diddle Arena; Bowling Green, KY
2/28/1994		Louisiana Tech	W 70–47	17–9 (13-4)	E. A. Diddle Arena; Bowling Green, KY
3/2/1994		Texas-Pan American	W 71–60	18–9 (14-4)	E. A. Diddle Arena; Bowling Green, KY
1994 Sun Belt Conference men's basketball tournament
3/5/1994	(1)	(8) Arkansas-Little Rock; Second Round	W 72–69	19–9	E. A. Diddle Arena; Bowling Green, KY
3/6/1994	(1)	(4) Jacksonville; Semifinals	W 83–72	20–9	E. A. Diddle Arena; Bowling Green, KY
3/8/1994	(1)	(2) SW Louisiana; Finals	L 72–78	20–10	E. A. Diddle Arena; Bowling Green, KY
1994 NCAA Division I men's basketball tournament
3/17/1994*	(11 MW)	vs. (6 MW) No. 20 Texas; First Round	L 77–91	20–11	Kansas Coliseum; Park City, Kansas
*Non-conference game. ^{#}Rankings from AP Poll (M#) during NCAA Tournament is seed with Region. (#) Tournament seedings in parentheses.
