= 1992 Sun Belt Conference men's basketball tournament =

- Classification: Division I
- Season: 1991–92
- Teams: 11
- Site: Mississippi Coast Coliseum; Biloxi, MS
- Champions: Southwestern Louisiana (1st title)
- Winning coach: Marty Fletcher (1st title)
- MVP: Todd Hill (Southwestern Louisiana)

1991–92 Sun Belt Conference men's basketball standings
	Conf.				Overall
Team	W		L	PCT	W		L	PCT
Louisiana Tech	12	–	4	.750	22	–	9	.710
SW Louisiana †	12	–	4	.750	21	–	11	.656
Arkansas State	11	–	5	.688	17	–	11	.607
Western Kentucky	10	–	6	.625	21	–	11	.656
South Alabama	9	–	7	.563	14	–	14	.500
Arkansas-Little Rock	8	–	8	.500	17	–	13	.567
New Orleans	9	–	7	.563	17	–	15	.531
Lamar	7	–	9	.438	12	–	19	.387
Jacksonville	6	–	10	.375	12	–	17	.414
UCF	3	–	13	.188	10	–	18	.357
Texas-Rio Grande Valley	1	–	15	.063	3	–	26	.103
† 1992 Sun Belt Conference tournament winner Rankings from AP Poll

The 1992 Sun Belt Conference men's basketball tournament was held March 4–8, 1992 at the Mississippi Coast Coliseum in Biloxi, Mississippi.

Southwestern Louisiana defeated top-seeded Louisiana Tech in the championship game, 75–71, to win their first Sun Belt men's basketball tournament.

The Ragin' Cajuns, in turn, received an automatic bid to the 1992 NCAA tournament. Fellow Sun Belt member Louisiana Tech joined them in the tournament, earning an at-large bid.

== Format ==
The Sun Belt saw some drastic membership changes before the 1991–92 season. Five long-time members departed the conference: UAB joined the Great Midwest, Old Dominion joined the CAA, and South Florida, UNC Charlotte, and VCU joined the Metro Conference. In turn, eight new teams were added: Arkansas–Little Rock, Arkansas State, Central Florida, Lamar, Louisiana Tech, New Orleans, Southwestern Louisiana, and Texas–Pan American. Most came from the newly-defunct American South Conference while UALR came over from the Trans-America Athletic Conference.

In turn, the tournament format saw its own changes. Firstly, the tournament field expanded from eight to eleven teams. With all teams seeded based on regular-season conference records, the top five teams were given byes into the quarterfinal round while the bottom six teams were placed into the preliminary first round.

== Bracket ==
First round Wednesday, March 4 Thursday, March 5
9	Jacksonville	105
8	Lamar	78
11	Texas–Pan American	53
6	Arkansas–Little Rock	65
7	New Orleans	66
10	Central Florida	47

Quarterfinals; Thursday, March 5 Friday, March 6
1	Louisiana Tech	80
9	Jacksonville	66
5	South Alabama	94
4	Western Kentucky	95
3	Arkansas State	45
6	Arkansas–Little Rock	48
7	New Orleans	69
2	SW Louisiana	73

Semifinals; Saturday, March 7
1	Louisiana Tech	74
4	Western Kentucky	60
6	Arkansas–Little Rock	61
2	SW Louisiana	64

Championship; Sunday, March 8
1	Louisiana Tech	71
2	SW Louisiana	75

== See also ==
- American South Conference men's basketball tournament (1988–1991)
- Sun Belt Conference women's basketball tournament
