= George Almones =

American basketball player (1962–2012)

Personal information
- Born: September 21, 1962 Lakeland, Florida
- Died: December 20, 2012 (aged 50)
- Listed height: 6 ft 4 in (1.93 m)
- Listed weight: 190 lb (86 kg)

Career information
- High school: Kathleen (Lakeland, Florida)
- College: Louisiana (1982–1985)
- NBA draft: 1985: 6th round, 14th overall pick
- Drafted by: New Jersey Nets

Career history
- 1985–1986: Florida Suncoast Stingers
- 1986–1987: Charleston Gunners
- 1987–1988: Wyoming Wildcatters
- 1988: Presto Ice Cream Makers
- Stats at Basketball Reference

George Almones (September 21, 1962 – December 20, 2012) was an American professional basketball player.

Standing at 6"4', Almones attended the University of Southwestern Louisiana for three seasons from 1982–83 through 1984–85 before giving up his senior eligibility to turn pro early. He was a sixth-round draft choice of the New Jersey Nets in 1985 but has not played in the NBA. He performed with the CBA's Florida Suncoast Stingers in 1985–86 and was the Continental league's seventh-leading scorer in the 1986–87 season, hitting at a 22.1 point clip on .445 field goal shooting in 48 appearances with the Charleston Gunners, Almones served time with the Gunners and Wyoming Wildcatters in the following season.

In December 2012, Almones died at age 50 in his hometown of Lakeland, Florida, due from complications of heart failure.
