= Roy Ebron =

American basketball player (1951–2014)

Personal information
- Born: August 31, 1951 Norfolk, Virginia, U.S.
- Died: September 28, 2014 (aged 63) St. Rose, Louisiana, U.S.
- Listed height: 6 ft 9 in (2.06 m)
- Listed weight: 220 lb (100 kg)

Career information
- High school: Booker T. Washington (Norfolk, Virginia)
- College: Louisiana (1970–1973)
- NBA draft: 1974: 4th round, 68th overall pick
- Drafted by: New York Knicks
- Position: Center
- Number: 14

Career history
- 1973–1974: Utah Stars
- 1975: Iberia Superstars
- Stats at Basketball Reference

Roy Lester Ebron (August 31, 1951 – September 28, 2014) was an American basketball player who played one season in the original American Basketball Association (ABA).

== Career ==
Ebron played college basketball at Louisiana–Lafayette (then called the University of Southwestern Louisiana). He appeared in 40 games for the Utah Stars in the ABA during the 1973–74 season, averaging 6.2 points and 4.4 rebounds per game. He played for the Iberia Superstars in the European Professional Basketball League in 1975.

== Death ==
Ebron died on September 28, 2014, at his home in St. Rose, Louisiana.

== See also ==
- University of Southwestern Louisiana basketball scandal
