= Bart Bellairs =

American basketball coach

Biographical details
- Born: August 24, 1956 (age 70); Richmond, Kentucky, U.S.

Coaching career (HC unless noted)

Basketball
- 1978–1979: Lycoming (assistant)
- 1979–1981: Western Illinois (assistant)
- 1981–1983: Wilkes (assistant)
- 1983–1985: Wilkes
- 1985–1986: Maryland (assistant)
- 1986–1988: UMass (assistant)
- 1988–1993: James Madison (assistant)
- 1994–2005: VMI
- 2017–2018: Transylvania (assistant)

Baseball
- 1980–1981: Western Illinois (assistant)
- 1982–?: Wilkes

Cross country
- 1981–?: Wilkes

Administrative career (AD unless noted)
- 2008–2009: Savannah State
- 2009–2013: Southeastern Louisiana

Head coaching record
- Overall: 137–218 (basketball)

Accomplishments and honors

Awards
- Basketball; SoCon Coach of the Year (1995); Virginia State Coach of the Year (1996)

Wesley "Bart" Bellairs (born August 24, 1956) is an American former college basketball coach and college athletics administrator. He worked at the Virginia Military Institute (VMI) for fourteen years, including 11 season head coach of VMI Keydets basketball team, from 1994 to 2005. After three years of serving as the school's senior associate athletic director, Bellairs was the athletic director at Savannah State University from 2008 to 2009 and Southeastern Louisiana University from 2009 to 2013. He also coached baseball and cross country.

Bellairs is a 1979 graduate of Warren Wilson College, and received his master's degree from Western Illinois University in 1981. He is a native of Richmond, Kentucky.

== Coaching career ==
Bellairs began his coaching career as an assistant basketball coach at Lycoming College in Williamsport, Pennsylvania. He then spent two years as an assistant coach in baseball and basketball at Western Illinois University in Macomb, Illinois. In August 1981, Bellairs was hired at Wilkes University in Wilkes-Barre, Pennsylvania, as head cross country coach, assistant baseball coach, and director of intramural sports. Bellairs was also an assistant basketball coach at Wilkes for two season before succeeding Jim Atheron as head basketball coach in 1983.

Bellairs then served brief stints as an assistant coach, first for the Maryland Terrapins from 1985 to 1986, and later as an assistant for the UMass and James Madison basketball programs, leading JMU to an NCAA tournament appearance as well as five NIT appearances. He was hired as VMI's head basketball coach in 1994, replacing Joe Cantafio, who had been serving the past eight seasons. Bellairs made an impression in his first season by winning Southern Conference Coach of the Year honors in 1995. The following year, Bellairs led the Keydets to an 18–10 overall record, including 10–4 in conference play. It was the program's first winning season since 1984–85, and the most wins in a single season since 1978.

Despite the initial success, the team failed to achieve a winning season in eight of the next nine years under Bellairs' tenure. Bellairs was fired in 2005 after a 9–18 campaign, though continued to work with VMI as the Senior Associate Athletic Director for Operations and Marketing until 2008. Despite his .378 winning percentage, by the end of his coaching career, Bellairs was the all-time winningest coach in the school's history with 116 wins, and held that record until it was surpassed by current Keydet head coach Duggar Baucom.

== Administrative career ==
Following his departure from VMI, Bellairs was introduced as Savannah State University's athletic director in May 2008, and took over the position on June 1 of that year. He was the first white athletic director at the historically black college. His tenure at Savannah State was short-lived, as Bellairs took the job as A.D. of Southeastern Louisiana University in November 2009, just 18 months after being hired by Savannah State.

Bellairs resigned from the school in June 2013. He was replaced in the interim by the Lions' head baseball coach Jay Artigues, who ultimately became the full-time athletic director.

== Personal life ==
Bellairs was born in Richmond, Kentucky, in 1956. He was a letterman in basketball and baseball at Warren Wilson College where he earned his undergraduate degree in sociology. Two years later, Bellairs earned his master's degree from Western Illinois.

He and his wife, Jacki Berkshire Bellairs, have five children: their three sons, Andrew, Jacob, and Will; as well as two daughters, Katie and Alli.

== Head coaching record ==
=== Basketball ===
Record table
Season	Team	Overall	Conference	Standing	Postseason
Wilkes Colonels (MAC Freedom Conference) (1983–1985)
1983–84	Wilkes	7–16	3–10	T–4th	
1984–85	Wilkes	14–11	10–6	T–1st	MAC Tournament
Wilkes:		21–27	13–16		
VMI Keydets (Southern Conference) (1994–2003)
1994–95	VMI	10–17	6–8	4th (North)	
1995–96	VMI	18–10	10–4	2nd (North)	
1996–97	VMI	12–16	7–7	4th (North)	
1997–98	VMI	14–13	8–7	3rd (North)	
1998–99	VMI	12–15	9–7	3rd (North)	
1999–00	VMI	6–23	1–15	6th (North)	
2000–01	VMI	9–19	5–11	5th (North)	
2001–02	VMI	10–18	5–11	5th (North)	
2002–03	VMI	10–20	3–13	8th	
VMI Keydets (Big South Conference) (2003–2005)
2003–04	VMI	6–22	4–12	8th	
2004–05	VMI	9–18	3–13	9th	
VMI:		116–191	61–108		
Total:		137–218			
