= 1991–92 Southwestern Louisiana Ragin' Cajuns men's basketball team =

American college basketball season

1991–92 Southwestern Louisiana Ragin' Cajuns men's basketball

Sun Belt regular season and tournament champions

NCAA tournament, second round
- Conference: Sun Belt Conference
- Record: 21–11 (12–4 Sun Belt)
- Head coach: Marty Fletcher (6th season)
- Home arena: Cajundome

1991–92 Sun Belt Conference men's basketball standings
	Conf.				Overall
Team	W		L	PCT	W		L	PCT
Louisiana Tech	12	–	4	.750	22	–	9	.710
SW Louisiana †	12	–	4	.750	21	–	11	.656
Arkansas State	11	–	5	.688	17	–	11	.607
Western Kentucky	10	–	6	.625	21	–	11	.656
South Alabama	9	–	7	.563	14	–	14	.500
Arkansas-Little Rock	8	–	8	.500	17	–	13	.567
New Orleans	9	–	7	.563	17	–	15	.531
Lamar	7	–	9	.438	12	–	19	.387
Jacksonville	6	–	10	.375	12	–	17	.414
UCF	3	–	13	.188	10	–	18	.357
Texas-Rio Grande Valley	1	–	15	.063	3	–	26	.103
† 1992 Sun Belt Conference tournament winner Rankings from AP Poll

The 1991–92 Southwestern Louisiana Ragin' Cajuns men's basketball team represented the University of Southwestern Louisiana as a member of the Sun Belt Conference during the 1991–92 NCAA Division I men's basketball season. The Ragin' Cajuns, led by 6th-year head coach Marty Fletcher, played their home games at Cajundome in Lafayette, Louisiana. The team finished atop the conference regular season standings, and followed that success by winning the Sun Belt tournament to earn an automatic bid to the NCAA tournament. As the No. 13 seed in the West region, SW Louisiana defeated Oklahoma in the opening round, 87–83 before losing to New Mexico State in the second round, 81–73.

== Roster ==
1991–92 Southwestern Louisiana Ragin' Cajuns men's basketball team
Players
Coaches

Pos.	#	Name	Height	Weight	Year	Hometown
F		Todd Hill	6 ft 9 in (2.06 m)	—	Jr
G	44	Byron Starks	6 ft 5 in (1.96 m)	—	So

Head coach

- Marty Fletcher (Maryland)

Assistant coach(es)

Legend

- (C) Team captain
- (S) Suspended
- (I) Ineligible
- (W) Walk-on
- Injured
- Current redshirt

== Schedule and results ==
Date time, TV	Rank^{#}	Opponent^{#}	Result	Record	Site (attendance) city, state
Non-conference regular season
Nov 23, 1991*		Northern Iowa	L 77–78	0–1	Cajundome; Lafayette, Louisiana
Nov 29, 1991*		Ole Miss	W 96–87	1–1	Cajundome; Lafayette, Louisiana
Dec 16, 1991*		at Memphis State	L 97–105	1–5	The Pyramid; Memphis, Tennessee
Sun Belt regular season
Feb 29, 1992*		Lamar	W 80–70	17–10 (12–4)	Cajundome; Lafayette, Louisiana
Sun Belt tournament
Mar 6, 1992*	(2)	vs. (7) New Orleans; Quarterfinals	W 73–69 ^{OT}	18–10	Mississippi Coast Coliseum; Biloxi, Mississippi
Mar 7, 1992*	(2)	vs. (6) Arkansas–Little Rock; Semifinals	W 64–61	19–10	Mississippi Coast Coliseum; Biloxi, Mississippi
Mar 8, 1992*	(2)	vs. (1) Louisiana Tech; Championship	W 75–71	20–10	Mississippi Coast Coliseum; Biloxi, Mississippi
NCAA tournament
Mar 20, 1992*	(13 W)	vs. (4 W) No. 23 Oklahoma; First round	W 87–83	21–10	ASU Activity Center; Tempe, Arizona
Mar 22, 1992*	(13 W)	vs. (12 W) New Mexico State; Second round	L 73–81	21–11	ASU Activity Center; Tempe, Arizona
*Non-conference game. ^{#}Rankings from AP poll. (#) Tournament seedings in parentheses. W=West. All times are in Central Time.
