= 1993–94 Southwestern Louisiana Ragin' Cajuns men's basketball team =

American college basketball season

1993–94 Southwestern Louisiana Ragin' Cajuns men's basketball

Sun Belt tournament champions

NCAA tournament, first round
- Conference: Sun Belt Conference
- Record: 22–8 (13–5 Sun Belt)
- Head coach: Marty Fletcher (8th season)
- Home arena: Cajundome

1993–94 Sun Belt Conference men's basketball standings
	Conf.				Overall
Team	W		L	PCT	W		L	PCT
Western Kentucky	14	–	4	.778	20	–	11	.645
SW Louisiana †	13	–	5	.722	22	–	8	.733
New Orleans	12	–	6	.667	20	–	10	.667
Jacksonville	11	–	7	.611	17	–	11	.607
Arkansas State	10	–	8	.556	15	–	12	.556
South Alabama	9	–	9	.500	13	–	14	.481
Texas-Pan American	9	–	9	.500	16	–	12	.571
Arkansas-Little Rock	6	–	12	.333	13	–	15	.464
Lamar	6	–	12	.333	10	–	17	.370
Louisiana Tech	0	–	18	.000	2	–	25	.074
† 1994 Sun Belt Conference tournament winner Rankings from AP Poll

The 1993–94 Southwestern Louisiana Ragin' Cajuns men's basketball team represented the University of Southwestern Louisiana as a member of the Sun Belt Conference during the 1993–94 NCAA Division I men's basketball season. The Ragin' Cajuns, led by 8th-year head coach Marty Fletcher, played their home games at Cajundome in Lafayette, Louisiana. The team finished second in the conference regular season standings, and won the Sun Belt tournament to earn an automatic bid to the NCAA tournament. As the No. 11 seed in the Southeast region, SW Louisiana lost to No. 6 seed Marquette in the opening round, 81–59.

== Roster ==
1993–94 Southwestern Louisiana Ragin' Cajuns men's basketball team
Players	Coaches
Pos. / # / Name / Height / Weight / Year / Hometown; G / 44 / Byron Starks / 6 ft 5 in (1.96 m) / — / Sr	Head coach: Marty Fletcher (Maryland); Assistant coach(es) Legend: (C) Team captain; (S) Suspended; (I) Ineligible; (W) Walk-on; Injured; Current redshirt

== Schedule and results ==
Date time, TV	Rank^{#}	Opponent^{#}	Result	Record	Site (attendance) city, state
Non-conference regular season
Dec 1, 1993*		Texas Wesleyan	W 109–86	1–0	Cajundome; Lafayette, Louisiana
Dec 4, 1993*		Boise State	W 61–57	2–0	Cajundome; Lafayette, Louisiana
Dec 15, 1993*		Sam Houston State	W 100–66	3–0	Cajundome; Lafayette, Louisiana
Dec 20, 1993*		at Baylor	L 82–87	3–1	Ferrell Center; Waco, Texas
Dec 23, 1993*		Memphis State	W 82–79	4–1	Cajundome; Lafayette, Louisiana
Dec 29, 1993*		vs. Alcorn State; Albertson's Holiday Classic	W 96–59	5–1	BSU Pavilion; Boise, Idaho
Dec 30, 1993*		at Boise State; Albertson's Holiday Classic	W 83–80	6–1	BSU Pavilion; Boise, Idaho
Sun Belt regular season
Jan 3, 1994		at Jacksonville	W 89–78	7–1 (1–0)	Jacksonville Memorial Coliseum; Jacksonville, Florida
Jan 5, 1994*		at Southern Miss	L 83–90	7–2	Reed Green Coliseum; Hattiesburg, Mississippi
Jan 8, 1994		at South Alabama	W 61–59	8–2 (2–0)	Jaguar Gym; Mobile, Alabama
Jan 10, 1994		Lamar	W 78–59	9–2 (3–0)	Cajundome; Lafayette, Louisiana
Jan 13, 1994		at Arkansas–Little Rock	W 86–75	10–2 (4–0)	Barton Coliseum; Little Rock, Arkansas
Jan 15, 1994		Texas–Pan American	W 90–75	11–2 (5–0)	Cajundome; Lafayette, Louisiana
Jan 20, 1994		at Arkansas State	L 68–73	11–3 (5–1)	Convocation Center; Jonesboro, Arkansas
Jan 22, 1994		Louisiana Tech	W 83–76	12–3 (6–1)	Cajundome; Lafayette, Louisiana
Jan 24, 1994		at Western Kentucky	L 87–91	12–4 (6–2)	E. A. Diddle Arena; Bowling Green, Kentucky
Jan 27, 1994		Arkansas State	W 72–69	13–4 (7–2)	Cajundome; Lafayette, Louisiana
Jan 29, 1994		at New Orleans	L 74–85	13–5 (7–3)	Lakefront Arena; New Orleans, Louisiana
Feb 2, 1994		Arkansas–Little Rock	W 81–67	14–5 (8–3)	Cajundome; Lafayette, Louisiana
Feb 5, 1994		Western Kentucky	L 62–78	14–6 (8–4)	Cajundome; Lafayette, Louisiana
Feb 10, 1994		South Alabama	W 86–77	15–6 (9–4)	Cajundome; Lafayette, Louisiana
Feb 12, 1994		at Lamar	W 86–80	16–6 (10–4)	Montagne Center; Beaumont, Texas
Feb 14, 1994		at Texas–Pan American	W 57–53	17–6 (11–4)	UTPA Fieldhouse; Edinburg, Texas
Feb 19, 1994		Jacksonville	L 68–70	17–7 (11–5)	Cajundome; Lafayette, Louisiana
Feb 23, 1994		New Orleans	W 73–69	18–7 (12–5)	Cajundome; Lafayette, Louisiana
Feb 26, 1994		at Louisiana Tech	W 91–51	19–7 (13–5)	Thomas Assembly Center; Ruston, Louisiana
Sun Belt tournament
Mar 5, 1994*	(2)	vs. (7) Texas-Pan American; Quarterfinals	W 81–60	20–7	E. A. Diddle Arena; Bowling Green, Kentucky
Mar 6, 1994*	(2)	vs. (3) New Orleans; Semifinals	W 59–55	21–7	E. A. Diddle Arena; Bowling Green, Kentucky
Mar 7, 1994*	(2)	at (1) Western Kentucky; Championship game	W 78–72	22–7	E. A. Diddle Arena; Bowling Green, Kentucky
NCAA tournament
Mar 18, 1994*	(11 SE)	vs. (6 SE) No. 21 Marquette; First round	L 59–81	22–8	Tropicana Field; St. Petersburg, Florida
*Non-conference game. ^{#}Rankings from AP poll. (#) Tournament seedings in parentheses. SE=Southeast. All times are in Central Time.
