= Jimmy Walker (basketball, born 1913) =

American football and basketball coach (1913–1943)

Biographical details
- Born: April 9, 1913; Anniston, Alabama, U.S.
- Died: December 22, 1943 (aged 30); Brazil
- Education: University of Alabama

Coaching career (HC unless noted)

Basketball
- 1936–1937: El Dorado HS
- 1937–1938: VMI (asst.)
- 1938–1942: VMI

Football
- 1936: El Dorado HS
- 1937–1941: VMI (asst.)

Head coaching record
- Overall: 27–39 (basketball)

James Edwin Walker (April 9, 1913 – December 22, 1943) was an American football and basketball coach. Walker played both basketball and football for the University of Alabama before he took his first coaching job upon graduation at El Dorado High School. After only one year at El Dorado, Walker went on to serve as head basketball and as an assistant football coach at the Virginia Military Institute (VMI). During his tenure as head coach of the Keydets, Walker compiled an overall record of 27–39. In 1942, Walker resigned his coaching positions and joined the United States Navy. Walker died at the age of 30 in Brazil on December 22, 1943, as a result of injuries sustained as part of his military service.

== Early years ==
Walker was born in 1913 in Anniston, Alabama. In 1925, he moved with his family to Holt where he became a star athlete at Holt High School. After high school, Walker enrolled at the University of Alabama, where he played on both the basketball and football teams. As a member of the football team, he was a substitute on the 1934 squad that won both the Rose Bowl and national championship. In his senior season, Walker was selected as captain of the 1935 squad. As a member of the basketball team, Walker played forward and was named All-SEC for both the 1933–34 and 1934–35 seasons and as Kellogg All America in 1934–35. He was also named captain of the 1934–35 squad.

== Coaching career ==
After he graduated from Alabama in 1935, Walker served as head basketball coach, football coach and athletic director at El Dorado High School in 1936–37. From El Dorado, Walker moved on to VMI where he served as head basketball coach and as an assistant football coach under former Alabama star Allison Hubert. During his four years as head coach, Walker compiled an overall record of 27–39.

== Head coaching record ==
Record table
Season	Coach	Overall	Conference	Standing	Postseason
VMI (Southern Conference) (1938–1942)
1938–39	VMI	7–10	6–6	T–9th	
1939–40	VMI	3–12	2–9	14th	
1940–41	VMI	10–6	8–4	T–5th	
1941–42	VMI	7–11	5–9	10th	
VMI:		27–39			
Total:		27–39			

== Military service ==
In 1942, Walker resigned his coaching positions and joined the United States Navy, and he was trained as a pilot at the Georgia Pre-Flight school. Walker made the rank of first lieutenant with the Navy but later died in service in Brazil on December 22, 1943. His body was not returned until 1948, when he was buried at Tuscaloosa Memorial Park on April 22, 1948.
