= Weenie Miller =

American basketball coach, athletic director, and sportcaster

Biographical details
- Born: 1922; Richmond, Virginia, U.S.
- Died: May 23, 2003 (aged 80–81); Virginia Beach, Virginia, U.S.

Playing career
- 1944–1947: Richmond

Coaching career (HC unless noted)
- 1955–1957: Hampden–Sydney College
- 1957–1958: Washington and Lee Univ.
- 1958–1964: VMI

Head coaching record
- Overall: 79–123

Louis F. "Weenie" Miller (1922 – May 23, 2003) was an American college basketball coach, athletic director, and sportcaster. Born in Richmond, Virginia, Miller endured a nine-year head coaching career with Hampden–Sydney College, Washington and Lee University, and, most notably, the Virginia Military Institute, where he led the Keydets to the school's first NCAA tournament appearance in 1964.

Miller graduated from the University of Richmond in 1947 where he earned all-state honors in baseball and basketball. In addition to serving as a coach in multiple sports, Miller enjoyed a brief semi-professional career in baseball and basketball.

== Early life ==
Miller was born in Richmond, Virginia in 1922. He attended Benedictine High School, a private Catholic military school, where he was an exceptional athlete. Miller continued his athletic career at the University of Richmond. As a senior, Miller captained the school's basketball and baseball teams. He went on to earn All-State honors in both sports and make the All-Southern Conference team in baseball.

Following his graduation from Richmond in 1947, Miller became the head football, baseball and basketball coach at nearby Glen Allen High School. In addition, Miller played minor league baseball for the Norfolk Tars of the now defunct Piedmont League, as well as the Richmond Barons basketball team.

== Coaching career ==
In 1955, Miller received his first head coaching job at Hampden–Sydney College in the town of the same name. In his two seasons with the Tigers, which were both winning seasons, Miller had a 29–23 record. He then left for Washington and Lee University in Lexington, Virginia where he stayed for one season.

Following his stints at Hampden–Sydney and Washington & Lee, Miller moved up to the Division I ranks in 1958, taking a job as head basketball coach of the Virginia Military Institute, situated adjacent to Washington and Lee in Lexington. Although five of his six seasons at VMI were losing seasons, Miller was notable for leading the Keydets to their first Southern Conference tournament championship in 1964. In the semifinals of the tournament, VMI upset the nationally ranked Davidson Wildcats, led by Lefty Driesell, by a score of 82–81 at the Charlotte Coliseum. Davidson was 22–4 and 9–2 in the SoCon and had beaten the Keydets by 38 points earlier in the year. VMI went on to defeat George Washington in the tournament finals, though they were promptly eliminated by the Princeton Tigers in the first round of the NCAA tournament.

Following the conclusion of the 1963–64 season, Miller resigned from the institute, and was replaced by his assistant Gary McPherson.

== Later career ==
Following his tenure as a coach, Miller entered private business for twenty years. During this time, Miller worked as a radio color commentator for VMI alongside Joe Knakal through the 1970s and early 1980s. He later spent six years working the same job for Hampden–Sydney.

Miller was named the Hampden–Sydney athletic director in 1986. Under his direction, the Tigers won their first ODAC baseball championship in 1989. He also established the Hampden-Sydney College Athletic Hall of Fame in 1988. After a long career devoted to college athletics, Miller was added to the Athletic Hall of Fame of Richmond, Hampden–Sydney, and VMI, as well as the Virginia Sports Hall of Fame.

== Head coaching record ==
=== Basketball ===
Record table
Season	Team	Overall	Conference	Standing	Postseason
Hampden–Sydney (Mason–Dixon Conference) (1955–1957)
1955–56	Hampden–Sydney	15–11			
1956–57	Hampden–Sydney	14–12			
Hampden–Sydney:		29–23			
Washington & Lee (Southern Conference) (1957–1958)
1957–58	Washington & Lee	9–16	4–9	9th	
Washington & Lee:		9–16	4–9		
VMI Keydets (Southern Conference) (1958–1964)
1958–59	VMI	5–13	2–11	9th	
1959–60	VMI	4–16	3–11	7th	
1960–61	VMI	5–17	3–11	8th	
1961–62	VMI	9–11	6–8	6th	
1962–63	VMI	6–15	6–10	7th	
1963–64	VMI	12–12	7–7	4th	NCAA First Round
VMI:		41–83	27–58		
Total:		79–123			
National champion Postseason invitational champion Conference regular season champion Conference regular season and conference tournament champion Division regular season champion Division regular season and conference tournament champion Conference tournament champion
