= Pinky Spruhan =

American sports coach (1890–1965)

Biographical details
- Born: November 9, 1890; Waveland, Indiana, U.S.
- Died: December 31, 1965 (aged 75); Roanoke, Virginia, U.S.
- Education: Ohio Northern University; University of Mississippi

Coaching career (HC unless noted)

Football
- 1913–1929: Roanoke
- 1913–1917: Salem HS (VA)

Basketball
- 1913–1920: Roanoke
- 1913–1918: Salem HS (VA)
- 1919–1922: VMI
- 1921–1930: Roanoke

Baseball
- 1913–1930: Roanoke

Guy Harvey "Pinky" Spruhan (November 9, 1890 – December 31, 1965) was an American college football, basketball, and baseball coach. Born and raised in Waveland, Indiana, Spruhan spent over fifty years of his life involved in Virginia sports, including tenure as a head coach of Roanoke College and the Virginia Military Institute. He attended college at Ohio Northern University as well as the University of Mississippi, at which he was a standout athlete in football, basketball, and baseball.

== Coaching career ==
Spruhan's coaching career began in 1913 where he joined Roanoke College in Salem, Virginia as head football, basketball, and baseball coach. He was also the school's head athletic director. His first stint with Roanoke spanned seven seasons, where he led the basketball team to a 65–19 mark. During part of this time he was also the head coach of Salem High School, and captured three consecutive basketball championships from 1916 to 1918, as well as a football title in 1917.

Spruhan then moved to the Virginia Military Institute in Lexington and headed the Keydets' basketball team from 1919 to 1922. He was also an assistant football and baseball coach. In three years, Spruhan's Keydets went 38–9, including two one-loss seasons. The .809 winning percentage remains the best in VMI history, and Spruhan is currently the last Keydet head coach to have a winning overall record.

After his stint with VMI, Spruhan returned to Roanoke where he would stay until 1930. His basketball coaching record of 100–81 is sixth all-time in school history.

== Personal life ==
Spruhan was born in 1891 in Waveland, Indiana. He grew up with two sisters, and attended the local Waveland High School where he was an acclaimed multi-sport athlete. His nickname, "Pinky", was given to him after he once showed up on a playing field wearing a faded red shirt, whereupon a nearby person asked, "Who's that little pinky over there?" Spruhan later attended college at Ohio Northern University and the University of Mississippi. At both schools, he excelled in football, basketball, and baseball.

Spruhan was heralded by Roanoke College for his athletic contributions to the school. In the 1923 version of the Rawenoch, the school's yearbook, Spruhan was praised for his "ceaseless and untiring efforts to turn out teams that will be a credit to the college." Spruhan is credited with establishing Roanoke's Monogram Club and the annual athletic award banquet each winter. The football field was later named Spruhan Field in his honor.

Spruhan was married to his wife, Wanetah. He spent the latter part of his life living in Salem, Virginia, and was also the commissioner of the Southwest Virginia Football Officials Association. Spruhan died in a nearby Roanoke hospital on December 31, 1965, due to a lung ailment. He left behind his three children, two sons and one daughter, as well as his two sisters.

== Head coaching record ==
=== College basketball ===
Record table
Season	Team	Overall	Conference	Standing	Postseason
Roanoke Maroons (Independent) (1913–1920)
1913–14	Roanoke	14–4			
1914–15	Roanoke	10–4			
1915–16	Roanoke	9–0			
1916–17	Roanoke	7–1			
1917–18	Roanoke	7–4			
1918–19	Roanoke	12–2			
1919–20	Roanoke	6–4			
VMI Keydets (Independent) (1919–1922)
1919–20	VMI	11–1			
1920–21	VMI	16–1			
1921–22	VMI	11–7			
VMI:		38–9			
Roanoke Maroons (Independent) (1921–1930)
1921–22	Roanoke	8–4			
1922–23	Roanoke	6–5			
1923–24	Roanoke	3–7			
1924–25	Roanoke	3–11			
1925–26	Roanoke	2–8			
1926–27	Roanoke	5–2			
1927–28	Roanoke	3–6			
1929–30	Roanoke	2–10			
Roanoke:		100–81			
Total:		138–90			

Note: This table includes records at the collegiate level only.
