= Frank Summers (coach) =

American sports coach (1899–1974)

Biographical details
- Born: August 2, 1899; Alexandria, Virginia, U.S.
- Died: August 17, 1974 (aged 75); Staunton, Virginia, U.S.

Playing career

Football
- 1920–1922: VMI
- Position: Tackle

Coaching career (HC unless noted)

Football
- 1933–1935: VMI (assistant)
- 1936–1941: Randolph–Macon
- 1942–1946: Hampden–Sydney

Basketball
- 1934–1936: VMI
- 1942–1943: Hampden–Sydney
- 1946–1947: Hampden–Sydney

Administrative career (AD unless noted)
- 1946–1951: VMI

Head coaching record
- Overall: 36–77 (basketball)

Francis Lee Summers (August 2, 1899 – August 17, 1974) was an American football, basketball, and baseball coach. A 1922 graduate of the Virginia Military Institute, Summers played all three sports in his time as a cadet, as well as track. He was a member of the Keydets' 1920 football team known as the "Flying Squadron", the program's only undefeated and tie-free team. Summers served as athletic director for VMI and Hampden–Sydney College, as well as the Staunton Military Academy. He is a member of the Virginia Sports Hall of Fame.

== Personal life ==
Summers was born in Alexandria, Virginia in 1899. He attended Alexandria High School then entered The United States Military Academy at West Point for one semester to placate one parent. He then transferred to Virginia Military Institute to placate the other parent. At Virginia Military Institute, he established himself immediately as a fine all-around cadet leader and athlete. He lettered in four sports: football, basketball, baseball, and track. He was the first VMI cadet to win letters in all of these sports, and ended up with twelve letters in three years. In football, Summers was named to the All-South Atlantic team and played a key role as left tackle and defensive line on the 1920 squad (nicknamed the "Flying Squadron") that was the first and only undefeated and tie-free VMI football team. He was captain of the track team where he specialized in the shot put and discus throw.

Summers was heralded for his excellence in athletics as well as academics, and was a second ranking officer in the Corps of Cadets. He earned more monograms than anyone in the school's history.

In 1944, Summers took a brief hiatus from college athletics to serve with the American Red Cross during World War II. He had previously attempted to join the military three times, but was rejected on all occasions due to physical reasons. Summers died in 1974 at the age of 75, leaving behind two children; a daughter, Anne, and a son, Frank Jr.

== Coaching career ==
Following his graduation from the VMI in 1922, Summers coached for one season at the nearby Augusta Military Academy. He then returned to Staunton Military where he coached the school in three sports for ten years, and went on to become its athletic director.

Summers later returned to his alma mater where he served two stints as a VMI head coach in three sports, from 1934 to 1936 and again in the late 1940s. His total head coaching record for the Keydets' basketball team was 12–61. He was the school's baseball coach for two years in 1950 and 1951, and also headed the freshman football teams. Summers was appointed as VMI's Director of Athletics in 1946, succeeding the long-tenured Blandy Clarkson. He left to head the Randolph–Macon College football team in 1936.

Summers coached three sports at Hampden–Sydney College in the mid-1940s, including a stint as football coach from 1942 to 1946. Additionally, Summers briefly served as the school's athletic director.

== Head coaching record ==
=== Football ===
Year	Team	Overall	Conference	Standing	Bowl/playoffs
Hampden–Sydney Tigers (Independent) (1942–1945)
1942	Hampden–Sydney	1–6–1			
1943	No team—World War II				
1944	Hampden–Sydney	1–3–1			
1945	Hampden–Sydney	0–0–1			
Hampden–Sydney Tigers (Mason–Dixon Conference) (1946)
1946	Hampden–Sydney	2–7	2–2	4th	
Hampden–Sydney:		4–16–3	2–2		
Total:		4–16–3			

=== Basketball ===
Record table
Season	Team	Overall	Conference	Standing	Postseason
VMI Keydets (Southern Conference) (1934–1936, 1947–1949)
1934–35	VMI	3–14	2–9	9th	
1935–36	VMI	3–14	0–10	10th	
1947–48	VMI	3–17	1–12	16th	
1948–49	VMI	3–17	3–8	15th	
VMI:		12–61	6–39		
Total:		12–61			
