= Bill Blair (basketball) =

American basketball coach

Personal information
- Born: May 17, 1942 (age 84) Hazard, Kentucky, U.S.
- Listed height: 6 ft 3 in (1.91 m)
- Listed weight: 175 lb (79 kg)

Career information
- High school: Randolph-Macon Academy (Front Royal, Virginia)
- College: VMI (1961–1964)
- NBA draft: 1964: 4th round, 97th overall pick
- Drafted by: St. Louis Hawks
- Coaching career: 1967–2001

Career history

Coaching
- 1967–1969: E.C. Glass HS (assistant)
- 1969–1970: George Wythe HS
- 1970–1972: VMI (assistant)
- 1972–1976: VMI
- 1976–1981: Colorado
- 1981–1983: New Jersey Nets (assistant)
- 1983: New Jersey Nets
- 1983–1985: Chicago Bulls (assistant)
- 1986–1991: Washington Bullets (assistant)
- 1991–1993: Indiana Pacers (assistant)
- 1993–1995: Minnesota Timberwolves
- 1996–1998: Indiana Pacers (assistant)
- 1999–2001: Cleveland Cavaliers (assistant)
- Stats at Basketball Reference

William Henry Blair Jr. (born May 17, 1942) is an American former basketball coach and player. Blair attended the Virginia Military Institute for college basketball. As team captain of the Keydets, he helped lead the team to their first Southern Conference championship in 1964, which saw them attend their first ever NCAA Tournament. He was drafted by the St. Louis Hawks in 1964 but did not play. He became a coach in 1967 and was hired by VMI to serve on their staff in 1970 and became their head coach in 1972. After three middling seasons, he led them to a conference championship in 1976 that saw then go to the Elite Eight in the NCAA Tournament. He left for the University of Colorado after the season ended. He coached five seasons before he was fired.

Blair then worked twenty seasons in the National Basketball Association, beginning in New Jersey with the New Jersey Nets, and continuing to the Chicago Bulls, under Kevin Loughery, helping to draft Michael Jordan. He then moved to the Washington Bullets under Wes Unseld, and next the Indiana Pacers under Larry Brown—coaching spectacular teams with Reggie Miller at the helm. In 1993, he became the head coach of the Minnesota Timberwolves, then returned to the Pacers, and finally finished his career under Randy Wittman at the Cleveland Cavaliers.

== Head coaching record ==
=== College ===
Record table
Season	Team	Overall	Conference	Standing	Postseason
VMI Keydets (Southern Conference) (1972–1976)
1972–73	VMI	7–19	3–9	8th	
1973–74	VMI	6–18	3–9	7th	
1974–75	VMI	13–13	6–6	T–4th	
1975–76	VMI	22–10	9–3	1st	NCAA Elite 8
VMI:		48–60	21–27		
Colorado Buffaloes (Big Eight Conference) (1976–1981)
1976–77	Colorado	11–16	5–9	6th	
1977–78	Colorado	9–18	3–11	8th	
1978–79	Colorado	14–13	4–10	8th	
1979–80	Colorado	17–10	7–7	5th	
1980–81	Colorado	16–12	5–9	6th	
Colorado:		67–69	24–46		
Total:		115–129			
National champion Postseason invitational champion Conference regular season champion Conference regular season and conference tournament champion Division regular season champion Division regular season and conference tournament champion Conference tournament champion

=== NBA ===
Legend
Regular season	G	Games coached	W	Games won	L	Games lost	W–L %	Win–loss %
Playoffs	PG	Playoff games	PW	Playoff wins	PL	Playoff losses	PW–L %	Playoff win–loss %

Team	Year	G	W	L	W–L%	Finish	PG	PW	PL	PW–L%	Result
New Jersey	1982–83	6	2	4	.333	3rd in Atlantic	–	–	–	–	L New York 0–2
Minnesota	1994–95	82	21	61	.256	6th in Midwest	–	–	–	–	Missed playoffs
Minnesota	1995–96	20	6	14	.300	(fired)	–	–	–	–	–
Career		108	29	79	.269		–	–	–	–	
