= Gary McPherson =

American basketball player and coach (1936–2018)

Biographical details
- Born: July 5, 1936; Cass, West Virginia, U.S.
- Died: December 5, 2018 (aged 82); Morgantown, West Virginia, U.S.

Playing career
- 1954–1958: Washington & Lee

Coaching career (HC unless noted)
- 1958–1961: Bluestone HS
- 1961–1963: Ferrum
- 1963–1964: VMI (asst.)
- 1964–1969: VMI
- 1969–1974: West Virginia (asst.)
- 1974–1976: Alderson Broaddus
- 1978–1993: West Virginia (asst.)

Head coaching record
- Overall: 42–116

Gary Dan McPherson (July 5, 1936 – December 5, 2018) was an American college basketball coach. A native of Cass, West Virginia, McPherson led the VMI Keydets for five seasons before working as a West Virginia men's basketball coach for twenty years. He was also the head coach for the Alderson Broaddus Battlers in nearby Philippi for two seasons.

== Early life ==
McPherson graduated from Green Bank High School (now known as Pocahontas County High School) in 1954 and attended college at Washington & Lee University. During his time at W&L, McPherson played on the football team, which at the time was competing in the Southern Conference, and earned a liberal arts degree.

== Coaching career ==
Immediately following his graduation from Washington & Lee, McPherson began coaching for Bluestone High School in Skipwith, Virginia. He was the school's head football and basketball coach. Three years later McPherson left for Ferrum Junior College where he headed the Panthers' basketball program for two seasons.

=== VMI ===
In 1963, McPherson joined the VMI Keydets basketball program and became the school's first full-time assistant coach. Under Louis "Weenie" Miller, McPherson and the Keydets ran through the 1964 Southern Conference Tournament en route to their first NCAA tournament appearance. Their season was promptly ended by Princeton in the first round.

Following the departure of Miller, McPherson would take over the helm and coach the Keydets for the next five years. The team failed to continue their success from the 1964 season, and McPherson did not achieve a winning season or advance in the SoCon tournament in his tenure there. He left the Institute with a 32–77 record.

=== West Virginia ===
Though his only time as a Division I head coach had finished, McPherson dedicated much of the next forty years to West Virginia University, largely as an assistant basketball coach. McPherson first worked under Sonny Moran in the 1970s, and later with Gale Catlett through the 1980s after a brief stint with Alderson Broaddus University. His coaching career came to an end in 1993, though McPherson continued to work with West Virginia as a fundraiser and director of the Mountaineer Athletic Club.

== Personal life ==
McPherson was married to Peggy, and the couple had two children, Chris and Missy. in addition to his degree from Washington & Lee, McPherson also obtained a master's degree from the University of Virginia.

In a November 2012 basketball game between VMI and West Virginia in Morgantown, McPherson was honored for his contributions to both schools in an on-court presentation. He was joined by his wife along with WVU coach Bob Huggins, former VMI players John Kemper and Steve Powers, and then-VMI Director of Athletics Donny White.

McPherson died on December 5, 2018, in Morgantown, West Virginia.

== Head coaching record ==
Record table
Season	Team	Overall	Conference	Standing	Postseason
VMI Keydets (Southern Conference) (1964–1969)
1964–65	VMI	8–13	5–9		
1965–66	VMI	5–18	5–11		
1966–67	VMI	5–16	4–12		
1967–68	VMI	9–12	8–7		
1968–69	VMI	5–18	3–11		
VMI:		32–77	25–50		
Alderson Broaddus (West Virginia Intercollegiate Athletic Conference) (1974–1976)
1974–75	Alderson Broaddus	3–21			
1975–76	Alderson Broaddus	7–18			
Alderson Broaddus:		10–39			
Total:		42–116			
National champion Postseason invitational champion Conference regular season champion Conference regular season and conference tournament champion Division regular season champion Division regular season and conference tournament champion Conference tournament champion
