= Andrew Wilson (basketball) =

American basketball coach (born 1982)

Current position
- Title: Head coach
- Team: VMI
- Conference: SoCon
- Record: 32–98 (.246)

Biographical details
- Born: July 6, 1982 (age 44)

Playing career
- 2000–2006: Florida State
- Position: Guard

Coaching career (HC unless noted)
- 2006–2012: College of Charleston (asst.)
- 2012–2013: Binghamton (asst.)
- 2013–2019: Georgia Southern (asst.)
- 2019–2020: Georgia Southern (assoc. HC)
- 2020–2022: James Madison (asst.)
- 2022–present: VMI

Head coaching record
- Overall: 32–98 (.246)

Andrew Wilson (born July 6, 1982) is an American basketball coach and former college basketball player. He is the head men's basketball coach at Virginia Military Institute.

== High school playing career ==
Wilson played high school basketball at Harrison High School in Kennesaw, Georgia. He graduated as the all-time leading scorer in the school's history, and was a two-time first team all-state honoree.

He was elected to the Harrison High School Hall of Fame in 2015.

== College playing career ==
Wilson played parts of six seasons for Leonard Hamilton at Florida State after receiving two medical redshirts for multiple injuries during his career. He captained the Seminoles during his senior season, and led the Seminoles to their first 20-win season in nine years, while also finished second in the country in three-point FG%.

At the end of his Florida State career, Wilson held records for best three-point FG% in a season, and most games played in a career.

== Coaching career ==
After graduating from Florida State, Wilson joined Bobby Cremins' staff at College of Charleston as an assistant coach. Following a one-year stint at Binghamton, Wilson joined the head coaching staff at Georgia Southern, reuniting with another assistant from College of Charleston, Mark Byington. In 2020, after Byington was hired as the head coach at James Madison, Wilson was hired to join his staff in Harrisonburg.

On April 11, 2022, Wilson was named the new head coach at VMI, his first head coaching position.

== Head coaching record ==
Record table
Season	Team	Overall	Conference	Standing	Postseason
VMI (Southern Conference) (2022–present)
2022–23	VMI	7–25	2–16	10th	
2023–24	VMI	4–28	1–17	10th	
2024–25	VMI	15–19	7–11	7th	
2025–26	VMI	6–26	1–17	10th	
2026–27	VMI	0–0	0–0		
VMI:		32–98 (.246)	11–61 (.153)		
Total:		32–98 (.246)			
National champion Postseason invitational champion Conference regular season champion Conference regular season and conference tournament champion Division regular season champion Division regular season and conference tournament champion Conference tournament champion
