= Joe Cantafio =

American basketball player and coach (born 1952)

Biographical details
- Born: April 6, 1952 (age 74); Dunmore, Pennsylvania, U.S.

Playing career
- 1970–1974: Scranton

Coaching career (HC unless noted)
- 1974–1978: Cardinal Gibbons HS
- 1978–1979: Abington Heights HS (asst.)
- 1979–1982: DeMatha Catholic HS (asst.)
- 1982–1986: VMI (asst.)
- 1986–1994: VMI
- 1994–1997: Furman

Head coaching record
- Overall: 109–198

Joseph Cantafio (born April 6, 1952) is an American retired college basketball coach. Cantafio spent a total of eleven seasons as a head coach, with the Virginia Military Institute (1986–1994) and Furman University (1994–1997). A graduate of the University of Scranton, Cantafio is vice president of The Blewitt Foundation, an organization that supports military families, as well as an assistant director at the Center for Sports Leadershipfor for Virginia Commonwealth University. He is also a member of the Pennsylvania Sports Hall of Fame.

== Early life ==
Cantafio was born on April 6, 1952, in Dunmore, Pennsylvania, and attended Dunmore High School. He attended college at the nearby University of Scranton and graduated in 1974 with a BS in history. Cantafio played on the school's basketball team for three years and was captain of the team as a senior. He also lettered in baseball and received an NCAA Postgraduate Scholarship from Scranton.

== Coaching career ==
Cantafio began coaching immediately following his graduation from Scranton, joining Cardinal Gibbons High School in Raleigh, North Carolina, in 1974. He led the Crusaders for four seasons in which he posted a 91–25 record at the school. Cantafio then spent one year with Abington Heights High School in his home state of Pennsylvania.

Following a 13–15 campaign at Abington Heights, Cantafio then joined DeMatha Catholic High School as an assistant where he served under legendary Morgan Wootten (who has the second most wins as a head coach in the history of basketball on any level and is a member of the Naismith Basketball Hall of Fame). In his three years under Wootten at DeMatha Catholic, the Stags went 83–9.

In 1982, Cantafio left for an assistant coaching job at the Virginia Military Institute where he worked under his predecessor Marty Fletcher for four seasons. Following Fletcher's departure, Cantafio assumed the position of head coach and led the Keydets for eight years. He never earned a winning season at VMI, though he did lead the 1987–88 team to the Southern Conference tournament finals. Cantafio resigned following the 1993–94 season and became the head coach of the Furman Paladins, a Southern Conference foe of VMI.

Cantafio was unable to gain success with Furman as he led the Paladins to a 30–47 record in three years. He announced in February 1997 that he would resign at the end of that season. He noted that he was tired of coaching, and said that, "As I was watching, it just dawned on me. There's a lot more to life than basketball." Cantafio also stated that he was unable to relax while coaching, and that some Furman boosters and alumni were not happy with the team's progress.

== Personal life ==
Following the end of his coaching career, Cantafio became involved with Virginia Commonwealth University, and was hired as an assistant director to VCU's SportsCenter, which helps students seeking a career in athletics. He is also the Head of Programs for The Blewitt Foundation, which seeks to comfort and assist military families, particularly children. Cantafio earned a master's degree in Sports Leadership from VCU in 2001.

Cantafio is married to his wife, Della, and the couple has two children: a daughter, Carissa, and a son, Joey. Joey is currently the Director of Basketball Operations at Lamar University. He played basketball for Virginia Military Institute from 2007 to 2009 before transferring to and graduating from Hampden–Sydney College in 2011.

== Head coaching record ==
Record table
Season	Team	Overall	Conference	Standing	Postseason
VMI Keydets (Southern Conference) (1986–1994)
1986–87	VMI	11–17	5–11	6th	
1987–88	VMI	13–17	6–10	7th	
1988–89	VMI	11–17	5–9	7th	
1989–90	VMI	14–15	7–7	T–4th	
1990–91	VMI	10–18	5–9	6th	
1991–92	VMI	10–18	3–11	T–6th	
1992–93	VMI	5–22	3–15	9th	
1993–94	VMI	5–23	2–16	10th	
VMI:		79–147 (.350)	36–88 (.290)		
Furman Paladins (Southern Conference) (1994–1997)
1994–95	Furman	10–17	6–8	T–3rd (South)	
1995–96	Furman	10–17	6–8	3rd (South)	
1996–97	Furman	10–17	4–10	5th (South)	
Furman:		30–51 (.370)	16–26 (.381)		
Total:		109–198 (.355)			
National champion Postseason invitational champion Conference regular season champion Conference regular season and conference tournament champion Division regular season champion Division regular season and conference tournament champion Conference tournament champion
