= Jack Null =

American basketball player and coach (1924–2003)

Biographical details
- Born: December 6, 1924; Staunton, Virginia, U.S.
- Died: May 8, 2003 (aged 78)

Playing career
- 1943–1947: Richmond

Coaching career (HC unless noted)
- 1951–1954: Staunton Military Academy
- 1954–1955: Lake Worth HS
- 1955–1958: VMI

Head coaching record
- Overall: 12–58

Marvin Jackson Null (December 6, 1924 – May 8, 2003) was an American college basketball coach. A native of Staunton, Virginia, and a graduate of the University of Richmond, Null coached the Virginia Military Institute basketball team for three years in the 1950s. In addition to his service to VMI, Null headed Richmond's freshman teams in football, basketball, and baseball for four seasons. He also coached Lake Worth High School in Lake Worth, Florida.

== Early life ==
Marvin Jackson Null was born on December 6, 1924, in Staunton, Virginia. He attended Staunton High School as well as the now-defunct Staunton Military Academy. After graduating in 1943, he attended the University of Richmond where he played on the school's football, basketball, and baseball teams. Null continued to work with Richmond following his graduation in 1947, coaching the freshman football, basketball, and baseball teams.

== Coaching career ==
After working four seasons with the Spiders, Null returned to his hometown to head the Staunton Military Academy basketball program. In three years at SMA, Null was 49–11 and the team won the 1951 North-eastern Prep School Basketball Tournament in Glens Falls, New York.

Null next went to Florida where he was the head coach of Lake Worth High School, now known as Lake Worth Community High School, for one season. He then returned to his home state in 1955 and joined the Virginia Military Institute in Lexington, near his hometown of Staunton. In his first year with the Keydets, the team went 4–19 and 3–11 in the Southern Conference. The Keydets never managed to win more than four games under Null, and he resigned following the conclusion of the 1957–58 campaign. His record at VMI was 12–58.

== Later life ==
Following his retirement from coaching, Null established a firm in 1964, Jack Null & Company. He started a prominent career in realty, directing the Virginia Association of Realtors, the Richmond Multiple Listing Service, and the Richmond Association of Realtors. Null was named the Realtor of the Year in 1987. Additionally, he was a founding member of the Richmond Sports Backers and a former director of the SMA Foundation.

Null died on May 8, 2003, due to complications from an aneurysm. He was 78 years old, and left behind five children.

== Head coaching record ==
=== Basketball ===
Record table
Season	Team	Overall	Conference	Standing	Postseason
VMI Keydets (Southern Conference) (1955–1958)
1955–56	VMI	4–19	3–11	9th	
1956–57	VMI	4–22	1–13	10th	
1957–58	VMI	4–17	1–12	10th	
VMI:		12–58	5–36		
Total:		12–58			
National champion Postseason invitational champion Conference regular season champion Conference regular season and conference tournament champion Division regular season champion Division regular season and conference tournament champion Conference tournament champion
