= Jay McWilliams =

American football and basketball coach (1915–2010)

Biographical details
- Born: June 7, 1915
- Died: October 17, 2010 (aged 95); Willoughby, Ohio, U.S.
- Education: Penn State University

Coaching career (HC unless noted)

Football
- 1957–1963: Trinity (CT) (assistant)

Basketball
- 1945–1946: VMI
- 1947–1957: Alfred
- 1957–1964: Trinity (CT)

Head coaching record
- Overall: 145–166 (basketball)

Charles Jay McWilliams (June 7, 1915 – October 17, 2010) was an American college basketball coach. A graduate of Penn State University, McWilliams was head coach of the Virginia Military Institute, Trinity College, and Alfred University during his twenty-year coaching career.

== Coaching career ==
McWilliams began coaching in 1945 at the Virginia Military Institute in Lexington, Virginia. At VMI, he led the Keydets basketball team to a 1–10 season, his only one with the school. This ranks him 27th (last) at VMI in total wins and 26th in terms of winning percentage.

After returning to school in Springfield, Massachusetts for a year, McWilliams picked up coaching again at Alfred University, in Allegany County, New York. He spent ten seasons at the school, and compiled a 78–96 record with the Saxons. Following his time at Alfred, McWilliams joined Trinity College in Connecticut, where he was head basketball coach from 1957 to 1965, as well as an assistant football. McWilliams' 66–60 record at Trinity make him third all-time in school history in wins as well as winning percentage.

After his twenty-year career in collegiate athletics, McWilliams became the director of physical education for Hudson City Public Schools in Hudson, Ohio. He became the city's first director of recreation. McWilliams was also tennis coach at Ashland University after retirement.

== Personal life ==
McWilliams attended Penn State University where he earned his Bachelor of Science in 1937. At Penn State McWilliams starred on the basketball team. He later earned a master's degree in process engineering from Springfield College in 1947. McWilliams briefly served in World War II as an athletic and recreation officer.

McWilliams died on October 17, 2010, in his hometown of Willoughby, Ohio. He preceded in death his wife, Natalie, and his three children, Kathryn, Peter, and Barbara.

== Head coaching record ==
Record table
Season	Team	Overall	Conference	Standing	Postseason
VMI Keydets (Southern Conference) (1945–1946)
1945–46	VMI	1–10	1–6	14th	
VMI:		1–10	1–6		
Alfred Saxons (Independent) (1947–1957)
1947–48	Alfred	11–9			
1948–49	Alfred	7–9			
1949–50	Alfred	8–9			
1950–51	Alfred	7–7			
1951–52	Alfred	13–7			
1952–53	Alfred	12–9			
1953–54	Alfred	3–13			
1954–55	Alfred	5–10			
1955–56	Alfred	7–12			
1956–57	Alfred	5–11			
Alfred:		78–96			
Trinity Bantams (Independent) (1957–1964)
1957–58	Trinity	4–12			
1958–59	Trinity	9–9			
1959–60	Trinity	14–4			
1960–61	Trinity	4–13			
1961–62	Trinity	12–7			
1962–63	Trinity	9–10			
1963–64	Trinity	14–5			
Trinity:		66–60			
Total:		145–166			
National champion Postseason invitational champion Conference regular season champion Conference regular season and conference tournament champion Division regular season champion Division regular season and conference tournament champion Conference tournament champion
