= Joe Daher =

American basketball and football coach (1913–1993)

Biographical details
- Born: 1913; Central City, Pennsylvania, U.S.
- Died: September 21, 1993 (aged 79–80); Dayton, Ohio, U.S.

Coaching career (HC unless noted)

Football
- 1939–1941: Morris Harvey (assistant)
- 1943–1944: VMI (assistant)
- 1949: VMI (asst.)

Basketball
- 1939–1942: Morris Harvey
- 1942–1943: Manhattan
- 1943–1945: VMI

Baseball
- 1940–1942: Morris Harvey

Head coaching record
- Overall: 52–76 (basketball)

Joseph G. Daher (1913 – September 21, 1993) was an American college basketball and football coach. A graduate of Juniata College, Daher coached the Manhattan Jaspers from 1942 to 1943 as well as the VMI Keydets basketball program from 1943 to 1945. He also coached three sports at Morris Harvey College (now known as the University of Charleston) in Charleston, West Virginia for three years. In 1940, Daher coauthored a book entitled "Fundamentals of Basketball" with the great Clair Bee. Additionally, Daher spent two seasons as a pitcher with the Pittsburgh Pirates in 1933 and 1934.

== Coaching career ==
Daher began coaching at Morris Harvey College, which has now been known as the University of Charleston since 1978. From 1939 to 1942, Daher coached the Golden Eagles in basketball and baseball, and assisted the football team as well. He then left for Manhattan College, where, in his first and only season, led the Jaspers basketball squad to an 18–3 record. This ranks him 15th all-time at Manhattan in terms of wins, and first in winning percentage.

Following a year in Manhattan, Daher then joined the Virginia Military Institute in Lexington, Virginia as the tight ends football coach, as well as head basketball coach. In two seasons, the Keydets were 2–24 under Daher, an .077 winning percentage. This ranks Daher 26th at VMI in total wins and 27th (last) in terms of winning percentage.

== Personal life ==
Daher was born in 1913 to his parents George Joseph and Selma Daher. He had a sister, Sadie, and three brothers, Vincent, Bernard, and Mitchell. He graduated from Juniata College in Huntingdon, Pennsylvania. At Juniata, Daher played and lettered in three sports. Daher then earned his master's degree at Bucknell University, where he was a pitcher on the Bison's baseball team.

In the latter stages of World War II, Daher took a hiatus from coaching and enlisted in the Army in 1945. At the time he was residing in Roanoke, Virginia. Daher spent the later part of his life living in Dayton, Ohio. He was married for 49 years to his wife Marguerite Alouf, who died in June 2015. They are survived by their four children: Richard, Selma, Joseph, and John. Daher was made an honorary member of the VMI Class of 1947.

== Head coaching record ==
=== Basketball ===
Record table
Season	Team	Overall	Conference	Standing	Postseason
Morris Harvey Golden Eagles (West Virginia Intercollegiate Athletic Conference) (1939–1942)
1939–40	Morris Harvey	12–18			
1940–41	Morris Harvey	11–15			
1941–42	Morris Harvey	9–16			
Morris Harvey:		32–49			
Manhattan Jaspers (Metropolitan New York Conference) (1942–1943)
1942–43	Manhattan	18–3	5–2	2nd	
Manhattan:		18–3	5–2		
VMI Keydets (Southern Conference) (1943–1945)
1943–44	VMI	0–14	0–5	12th	
1944–45	VMI	2–10	1–4	12th	
VMI:		2–24	1–9		
Total:		52–76			
