= Marty Fletcher =

American basketball player and coach

Biographical details
- Born: March 6, 1951 (age 75)

Coaching career (HC unless noted)
- 19??–19??: DeMatha Catholic HS (assistant)
- 1978–1982: NC State (assistant)
- 1982–1986: VMI
- 1986–1997: Louisiana
- 1997–2001: Denver
- 2001–2004: UCCS (women's HC)
- 2003–2004: UCCS (men's HC)

Head coaching record
- Overall: 251–320

Accomplishments and honors

Championships
- 2× Sun Belt Conference tournament champions (1992, 1994)

Martin P. "Marty" Fletcher (born March 6, 1951) is an American retired college basketball coach. Coaching for over twenty seasons from the early 1980s to 2004, Fletcher led three different Division I schools while winning two conference regular season and tournament championships while collecting over 250 total wins. During the 2003–04 season, Fletcher was the only coach in Division I or Division II to be the head coach for a school's men's and women's teams. That year, he took over the University of Colorado Colorado Springs (UCCS) men's team for one season while also spending his third year in charge of the women's team.

He is a 1973 graduate of the University of Maryland.

== Coaching career ==
Fletcher first became a head coach in 1982 for the Virginia Military Institute following the departure of his predecessor Charlie Schmaus. Schmaus had led the Keydets to a Sweet Sixteen appearance in 1977 and a 26–4 record, their best in school history. The team was led by future VMI Hall of Famer and NBA player Ron Carter. Despite the initial success, however, by the time Fletcher took over, the Keydets were coming off a 1–25 season and had only won five times in the past two years. In their first season under their new head coach, VMI continued to struggle with a 2–25 record, but showed significant improvement the following year and achieved a winning record by 1985 at 16–14. Fletcher then left the school the next season, leaving VMI with a .330 winning percentage.

Fletcher's most endured period of success came at the University of Southwestern Louisiana, now known as Louisiana. As the Ragin' Cajuns head coach for eleven years, he led the school to a regular season and tournament championship in 1992 in their inaugural Sun Belt Conference season, as well as another tournament title in 1994. Seven of Fletcher's eleven years at Louisiana produced winning seasons.

Fletcher then left for the Denver Pioneers, who were a Division II school at the time of his arrival. He assisted the program in its transition to Division I and the Sun Belt, but could not produce a winning season at Denver. He left the school following the conclusion of the 2000–01 season.

== Head coaching record ==
Note: These are for his college men's teams only. His time as UCCS's women's coach is not included in these records.

Record table
Season	Team	Overall	Conference	Standing	Postseason
VMI Keydets (Southern Conference) (1982–1986)
1982–83	VMI	2–25	1–15	9th	
1983–84	VMI	8–19	4–12	9th	
1984–85	VMI	16–14	7–9	T–5th	
1985–86	VMI	11–17	5–11	7th	
VMI:		37–75	17–47		
Southwestern Louisiana (Independent) (1986–1987)
1986–87	Southwestern LA	11–17			
Southwestern Louisiana (American South Conference) (1987–1991)
1987–88	Southwestern LA	12–16	3–7	6th	
1988–89	Southwestern LA	17–12	4–6	4th	
1989–90	Southwestern LA	20–9	4–6	4th	
1990–91	Southwestern LA	21–10	6–6	4th	
Southwestern Louisiana (Sun Belt Conference) (1991–1997)
1991–92	Southwestern LA	21–11	12–4	1st	NCAA Round of 32
1992–93	Southwestern LA	17–13	11–7	3rd	
1993–94	Southwestern LA	22–8	13–5	2nd	NCAA Round of 64
1994–95	Southwestern LA	7–22	4–14	9th	
1995–96	Southwestern LA	16–12	9–9	5th	
1996–97	Southwestern LA	12–16	9–9	7th	
Southwestern Louisiana:		176–146	75–73		
Denver (Division II) (1997–1998)
1997–98	Denver	7–20			
Denver (Independent) (1998–1999)
1998–99	Denver	10–17			
Denver (Sun Belt Conference) (1999–2001)
1999–00	Denver	6–22	3–13	8th	
2000–01	Denver	10–18	5–11	5th (West)	
Denver:		33–77	8–24		
UCCS (Division II) (1997–1998)
2003–04	UCCS	5–22		(West)	
UCCS:		5–22			
Total:		251–320			
National champion Postseason invitational champion Conference regular season champion Conference regular season and conference tournament champion Division regular season champion Division regular season and conference tournament champion Conference tournament champion
