= Indiana State Sycamores men's basketball statistical leaders =

The Indiana State Sycamores men's basketball statistical leaders are individual statistical leaders of the Indiana State Sycamores men's basketball program in various categories, including points, rebounds, assists, steals, and blocks. Within those areas, the lists identify single-game, single-season, and career leaders. The Sycamores represent Indiana State University in the NCAA's Missouri Valley Conference.

Indiana State began competing in intercollegiate basketball in 1895. However, the school's record book does not generally list records from before the 1950s, as records from before this period are often incomplete and inconsistent. Since scoring was much lower in this era, and teams played much fewer games during a typical season, it is likely that few or no players from this era would appear on these lists anyway.

The NCAA did not officially record assists as a stat until the 1983–84 season, and blocks and steals until the 1985–86 season, but Indiana State's record books includes players in these stats before these seasons. These lists are updated through the end of the 2020–21 season.

== Scoring ==
Career
| Rank | Player | Points | Seasons |
|---|---|---|---|
| 1 | Larry Bird | 2850 | 1976–77 1977–78 1978–79 |
| 2 | John Williams | 2370 | 1982–83 1983–84 1984–85 1985–86 |
| 3 | Jerry Newsom | 2147 | 1965–66 1966–67 1967–68 |
| 4 | Brenton Scott | 1760 | 2014–15 2015–16 2016–17 2017–18 |
| 5 | Butch Wade | 1672 | 1964–65 1965–66 1966–67 |
| 6 | Tyreke Key | 1650 | 2017–18 2018–19 2019–20 2020–21 |
| 7 | Jake Odum | 1568 | 2010–11 2011–12 2012–13 2013–14 |
| 8 | David Moss | 1562 | 2002–03 2003–04 2004–05 2005–06 |
| 9 | Jordan Barnes | 1558 | 2016–17 2017–18 2018–19 2019–20 |
| 10 | Eddie Bird | 1555 | 1987–88 1988–89 1989–90 1990–91 |

Season
| Rank | Player | Points | Season |
|---|---|---|---|
| 1 | Larry Bird | 973 | 1978–79 |
| 2 | Larry Bird | 959 | 1977–78 |
| 3 | Larry Bird | 918 | 1976–77 |
| 4 | Jerry Newsom | 809 | 1967–68 |
| 5 | Jerry Newsom | 745 | 1965–66 |
| 6 | Carl Nicks | 723 | 1979–80 |
| 7 | John Williams | 662 | 1984–85 |
| 8 | Carl Nicks | 656 | 1978–79 |
| 9 | Robbie Avila | 644 | 2023–24 |
| 10 | Howard Dardeen | 631 | 1961–62 |

Single game
| Rank | Player | Points | Season | Opponent |
|---|---|---|---|---|
| 1 | Larry Bird | 49 | 1978–79 | Wichita State |
| 2 | Larry Bird | 48 | 1978–79 | Butler |
| 3 | Larry Bird | 47 | 1976–77 | Missouri-St. Louis |
| | Larry Bird | 47 | 1976–77 | Butler |
| | Carl Nicks | 47 | 1979–80 | West Texas State |
| | John Williams | 47 | 1983–84 | West Texas State |
| 7 | Larry Bird | 45 | 1977–78 | Drake |
| | Larry Bird | 45 | 1976–77 | Loyola |
| | Larry Bird | 45 | 1977–78 | Central Michigan |
| | Nate Green | 45 | 1999–00 | Eastern Illinois |

== Rebounds ==
Career
| Rank | Player | Rebounds | Seasons |
|---|---|---|---|
| 1 | Larry Bird | 1247 | 1976–77 1977–78 1978–79 |
| 2 | Jerry Newsom | 953 | 1965–66 1966–67 1967–68 |
| 3 | DeCarsta Webster | 862 | 1975–76 1976–77 1977–78 |
| 4 | Matt Renn | 789 | 1997–98 1998–99 1999–00 2000–01 |
| 5 | Jim Cruse | 771 | 1993–94 1994–95 1995–96 1996–97 |
| 6 | George Pillow | 731 | 1968–69 1969–70 1970–71 |
| 7 | Carl Richard | 716 | 2008–09 2009–10 2010–11 2011–12 |
| 8 | Djibril Kante | 669 | 1998–99 1999–00 2000–01 2001–02 |
| 9 | Rick Williams | 661 | 1973–74 1974–75 1975–76 |
| 10 | John Williams | 629 | 1982–83 1983–84 1984–85 1985–86 |

Season
| Rank | Player | Rebounds | Season |
|---|---|---|---|
| 1 | Larry Bird | 505 | 1978–79 |
| 2 | Larry Bird | 373 | 1976–77 |
| 3 | Larry Bird | 369 | 1977–78 |
| 4 | DeCarsta Webster | 339 | 1975–76 |
| 5 | Howard Dardeen | 325 | 1961–62 |
| 6 | Jerry Newsom | 324 | 1967–68 |
| 7 | Jerry Newsom | 318 | 1966–67 |
| 8 | Jerry Newsom | 311 | 1965–66 |
| 9 | Rich Mason | 309 | 1967–68 |
| 10 | Jayson Kent | 308 | 2023–24 |

Single game
| Rank | Player | Rebounds | Season | Opponent |
|---|---|---|---|---|
| 1 | Jim Cruse | 25 | 1996–97 | Drake |
| 2 | Jim Gangloff | 23 | 1968–69 | Morningside |
| | Rich Mason | 23 | 1966–67 | Ball State |
| 4 | Bob Barker | 22 | 1969–70 | Butler |
| | Bob Barker | 22 | 1969–70 | Ball State |
| | Larry Bird | 22 | 1978–79 | Tulsa |
| | DeCarsta Webster | 22 | 1975–76 | Evansville |
| 8 | Rich Mason | 21 | 1967–68 | Valparaiso |
| 9 | Bob Barker | 20 | 1968–69 | Western Illinois |
| | Larry Bird | 20 | 1978–79 | West Texas State |
| | Larry Bird | 20 | 1977–78 | New Mexico State |
| | Jim Cruse | 20 | 1996–97 | Missouri State |
| | Johnny Edwards | 20 | 1984–85 | Butler |
| | Jayson Kent | 20 | 2023–24 | Drake |
| | Carl Macon | 20 | 1972–73 | Occidental |
| | Jayson Wells | 20 | 1997–98 | Evansville |

== Assists ==
Career
| Rank | Player | Assists | Seasons |
|---|---|---|---|
| 1 | Steve Reed | 616 | 1977–78 1978–79 1979–80 1980–81 |
| 2 | Jake Odum | 603 | 2010–11 2011–12 2012–13 2013–14 |
| 3 | Rick Fields | 551 | 1981–82 1982–83 1983–84 1984–85 |
| 4 | Jim Smith | 517 | 1974–75 1975–76 1976–77 1977–78 |
| 5 | Nate Green | 496 | 1996–97 1997–98 1998–99 1999–00 |
| 6 | Gabe Moore | 444 | 2004–05 2005–06 2006–07 2007–08 |
| 7 | Larry Bird | 435 | 1976–77 1977–78 1978–79 |
| 8 | Michael Menser | 426 | 1997–98 1998–99 1999–00 2000–01 |
| 9 | Julian Larry | 406 | 2020–21 2021–22 2022–23 2023–24 |
| 10 | Jordan Barnes | 386 | 2016–17 2017–18 2018–19 2019–20 |

Season
| Rank | Player | Assists | Season |
|---|---|---|---|
| 1 | Steve Reed | 239 | 1978–79 |
| 2 | Jim Smith | 221 | 1977–78 |
| 3 | Jim Smith | 207 | 1976–77 |
| 4 | Julian Larry | 188 | 2023–24 |
| 5 | Larry Bird | 187 | 1978–79 |
| 6 | Michael Menser | 184 | 2000–01 |
| 7 | Carl Nicks | 170 | 1978–79 |
| 8 | Rick Fields | 168 | 1984–85 |
| 9 | Samage Teel | 167 | 2024–25 |
| 10 | Jake Odum | 158 | 2011–12 |

Single game
| Rank | Player | Assists | Season | Opponent |
|---|---|---|---|---|
| 1 | Jim Smith | 16 | 1977–78 | Drake |
| 2 | Jim Smith | 15 | 1976–77 | Evansville |
| 3 | Jim Smith | 14 | 1976–77 | Eastern Michigan |
| 4 | Nick Hargrove | 13 | 1996–97 | Middle Tennessee St. |
| 5 | Larry Bird | 12 | 1976–77 | Central Michigan |
| | Rick Fields | 12 | 1983–84 | Tulsa |
| | Michael Menser | 12 | 2000–01 | Austin Peay |
| | Jake Odum | 12 | 2011–12 | Fairfield |
| | Jim Smith | 12 | 1976–77 | Wisconsin-Parkside |
| 10 | Samage Teel | 11 | 2024–25 | Belmont |
| | Samage Teel | 11 | 2024–25 | Ball State |
| | Xavier Bledson | 11 | 2023–24 | Saint Mary-Of-The-Woods |
| | Everett Clemons | 11 | 2016–17 | Wichita State |
| | Nate Green | 11 | 1996–97 | Southern Illinois |
| | Nate Green | 11 | 1999–00 | Tennessee State |
| | Michael Menser | 11 | 2000–01 | Wichita State |
| | Michael Menser | 11 | 2000–01 | Butler |
| | Steve Reed | 11 | 1979–80 | Drake |
| | Steve Reed | 11 | 1978–79 | Butler |
| | Jim Smith | 11 | 1976–77 | Centenary |
| | Jim Smith | 11 | 1976–77 | West Texas State |

== Steals ==
Career
| Rank | Player | Steals | Seasons |
|---|---|---|---|
| 1 | Larry Bird | 240 | 1976–77 1977–78 1978–79 |
| | Nate Green | 240 | 1996–97 1997–98 1998–99 1999–00 |
| 3 | Jake Odum | 204 | 2010–11 2011–12 2012–13 2013–14 |
| 4 | Gabe Moore | 203 | 2004–05 2005–06 2006–07 2007–08 |
| 5 | Michael Menser | 188 | 1997–98 1998–99 1999–00 2000–01 |
| 6 | Brenton Scott | 173 | 2014–15 2015–16 2016–17 2017–18 |
| 7 | Julian Larry | 168 | 2020–21 2021–22 2022–23 2023–24 |
| 8 | Matt Renn | 165 | 1997–98 1998–99 1999–00 2000–01 |
| 9 | Rick Fields | 149 | 1981–82 1982–83 1983–84 1984–85 |
| 10 | Jordan Barnes | 138 | 2016–17 2017–18 2018–19 2019–20 |

Season
| Rank | Player | Steals | Season |
|---|---|---|---|
| 1 | Nate Green | 92 | 1999–00 |
| 2 | Larry Bird | 85 | 1978–79 |
| 3 | Larry Bird | 78 | 1977–78 |
| 4 | Larry Bird | 77 | 1976–77 |
| 5 | Gabe Moore | 65 | 2007–08 |
| 6 | Jake Odum | 62 | 2010–11 |
| 7 | Nate Green | 61 | 1998–99 |
| | Michael Menser | 61 | 2000–01 |
| 9 | Carl Nicks | 60 | 1978–79 |
| | Matt Renn | 60 | 2000–01 |

Single game
| Rank | Player | Steals | Season | Opponent |
|---|---|---|---|---|
| 1 | Nate Green | 8 | 1999–00 | Eastern Illinois |
| | Jim Smith | 8 | 1977–78 | Drake |
| 3 | Gabe Moore | 7 | 2007–08 | Bowling Green |
| | Matt Renn | 7 | 2000–01 | Indiana |
| | Brenton Scott | 7 | 2017–18 | Drake |
| 6 | Adam Arnold | 6 | 2005–06 | Wichita State |
| | Nate Green | 6 | 1997–98 | Missouri State |
| | Nate Green | 6 | 1998–99 | Loyola |
| | Steve Hart | 6 | 1997–98 | Milwaukee |
| | Gabe Moore | 6 | 2005–06 | Drake |
| | Tyreke Key | 6 | 2018–19 | Valparaiso |

== Blocks ==
Career
| Rank | Player | Blocks | Seasons |
|---|---|---|---|
| 1 | DeCarsta Webster | 168 | 1975–76 1976–77 1977–78 |
| 2 | Isiah Martin | 136 | 2007–08 2008–09 2009–10 2010–11 |
| 3 | Djibril Kante | 127 | 1998–99 1999–00 2000–01 2001–02 |
| 4 | Emondre Rickman | 116 | 2015–16 2016–17 2017–18 2018–19 |
| 5 | Nate Green | 109 | 1996–97 1997–98 1998–99 1999–00 |
| 6 | Justin Gant | 96 | 2011–12 2012–13 2013–14 2014–15 |
| 7 | Jayson Wells | 94 | 1994–95 1995–96 1996–97 1997–98 |
| 8 | Larry Bird | 83 | 1976–77 1977–78 1978–79 |
| 9 | Alex Gilbert | 75 | 1978–79 1979–80 |
| | Tre Williams | 75 | 2019–20 2020–21 |

Season
| Rank | Player | Blocks | Season |
|---|---|---|---|
| 1 | DeCarsta Webster | 77 | 1975–76 |
| 2 | Jayson Wells | 70 | 1997–98 |
| 3 | Isiah Martin | 59 | 2007–08 |
| 4 | Djibril Kante | 50 | 2000–01 |
| 5 | DeCarsta Webster | 48 | 1976–77 |
| 6 | DeCarsta Webster | 43 | 1977–78 |
| | Alex Gilbert | 43 | 1978–79 |
| 8 | Terry Braun | 41 | 1983–84 |
| 9 | Tre Williams | 38 | 2020–21 |
| 10 | Tre Williams | 37 | 2019–20 |

Single game
| Rank | Player | Blocks | Season | Opponent |
|---|---|---|---|---|
| 1 | DeCarsta Webster | 11 | 1975–76 | Missouri-St. Louis |
| 2 | Josh Crawford | 7 | 2009–10 | Evansville |
| 3 | Djibril Kante | 6 | 2000–01 | Missouri State |
| | Djibril Kante | 6 | 1999–00 | Wichita State |
| | Jake Kitchell | 6 | 2014–15 | Saint Louis |
| | Isiah Martin | 6 | 2007–08 | Creighton |
| | Emondre Rickman | 6 | 2016–17 | Drake |
| 8 | Justin Gant | 5 | 2011–12 | Ball State |
| | Nate Green | 5 | 1997–98 | Northern Iowa |
| | Djibril Kante | 5 | 2000–01 | Missouri State |
| | Djibril Kante | 5 | 2000–01 | Bradley |
| | Dwayne Lathan | 5 | 2010–11 | Bradley |
| | Isiah Martin | 5 | 2008–09 | Evansville |
| | Lee Moore | 5 | 1984–85 | Butler |
| | Emondre Rickman | 5 | 2016–17 | Bradley |
| | Emondre Rickman | 5 | 2016–17 | Loyola Chicago |
| | Derrick Stroud | 5 | 1996–97 | Northern Iowa |
| | Devin Thomas | 5 | 2017–18 | Ohio |
| | John Williams | 5 | 1982–83 | West Texas State |
