= Klueh =

Klueh is a surname. Notable people with the surname include:

- Duane Klueh (1926–2024), American basketball player and coach
- Michael Klueh (born 1987), American swimmer
