= Carl Nicks =

Carl Nicks may refer to:

- Carl Nicks (basketball) (born 1958), retired NBA guard
- Carl Nicks (American football) (born 1985), retired guard for the New Orleans Saints and Tampa Bay Buccaneers
