= 2000–01 Indiana State Sycamores men's basketball team =

American college basketball season

2000–01 Indiana State Sycamores men's basketball

MVC tournament champions

NCAA tournament, second round
- Conference: Missouri Valley Conference
- Record: 22–12 (10–8 MVC)
- Head coach: Royce Waltman (4th season)
- Home arena: Hulman Center

2000–01 Missouri Valley Conference men's basketball standings
	Conf.				Overall
Team	W		L	PCT	W		L	PCT
Creighton	14	–	4	.778	24	–	8	.750
Bradley	12	–	6	.667	19	–	12	.613
Illinois State	12	–	6	.667	21	–	9	.700
Southern Illinois	10	–	8	.556	16	–	14	.533
Indiana State †	10	–	8	.556	22	–	12	.647
Evansville	9	–	9	.500	14	–	16	.467
Drake	8	–	10	.444	12	–	16	.429
Southwest Missouri State	8	–	10	.444	13	–	16	.448
Wichita State	4	–	14	.222	9	–	19	.321
Northern Iowa	3	–	15	.167	7	–	24	.226
† 2001 MVC tournament winner Rankings from AP Poll

The 2000–01 Indiana State Sycamores men's basketball team represented Indiana State University as a member of the Missouri Valley Conference during the 2000–01 men's college basketball season. After finishing fourth in the conference regular season standings, they won the MVC tournament to secure an automatic bid to the NCAA Tournament. Playing as the No. 13 seed in the South region, Indiana State knocked off No. 4 seed Oklahoma in the opening round. The Sycamores would fall to another cinderella, No. 12 seed Gonzaga, in the round of 32 to finish the season at 22–12 (10–8 MVC).

To date, this is the Sycamores' most recent appearance in the second round of the NCAA tournament.

== Roster ==
2000–01 Indiana State Sycamores men's basketball team
Players
Coaches

Pos.	#	Name	Height	Weight	Year	Hometown
F	3	Djibril Kante	6 ft 8 in (2.03 m)	—	Jr	Bloomington, Indiana
G	5	Michael Menser	5 ft 11 in (1.8 m)	—	Sr
F	32	Matt Renn	6 ft 6 in (1.98 m)	—	Sr

Head coach

- Royce Waltman

Assistant coach(es)

Legend

- (C) Team captain
- (S) Suspended
- (I) Ineligible
- (W) Walk-on
- Injured
- Current redshirt

== Schedule and results ==
Date time, TV	Rank^{#}	Opponent^{#}	Result	Record	Site city, state
Regular season
Nov 23, 2000*		vs. Georgia; Puerto Rico Shootout	L 64–82	0–1	Coliseo Rubén Rodríguez; Bayamón, Puerto Rico
Nov 24, 2000*		at American-Puerto Rico; Puerto Rico Shootout	W 85–58	1–1	Coliseo Rubén Rodríguez; Bayamón, Puerto Rico
Nov 25, 2000*		vs. Miami (OH); Puerto Rico Shootout	W 54–46	2–1	Coliseo Rubén Rodríguez; Bayamón, Puerto Rico
Nov 29, 2000*		Indiana	W 59–58	3–1	Hulman Center; Terre Haute, Indiana
Dec 2, 2000*		Austin Peay	W 76–70	4–1	Hulman Center; Terre Haute, Indiana
Dec 6, 2000*		Butler	W 90–88 ^{OT}	5–1	Hulman Center; Terre Haute, Indiana
Dec 9, 2000*		at Western Illinois	W 84–79	6–1	Western Hall; Macomb, Illinois
Dec 16, 2000*		at Ball State	L 74–80 ^{OT}	6–2	Worthen Arena; Muncie, Indiana
Dec 18, 2000*		Elon	W 80–54	7–2	Hulman Center; Terre Haute, Indiana
Dec 20, 2000*		at IUPUI	L 70–72	7–3	The Jungle; Indianapolis, Indiana
Dec 23, 2000		Bradley	W 79–70	8–3 (1–0)	Hulman Center; Terre Haute, Indiana
Dec 30, 2000*		Appalachian State	W 76–62	9–3	Hulman Center; Terre Haute, Indiana
Jan 4, 2001		Northern Iowa	W 69–57	10–3 (2–0)	Hulman Center; Terre Haute, Indiana
Jan 6, 2001		at Illinois State	W 78–71	11–3 (3–0)	Redbird Arena; Normal, Illinois
Jan 11, 2001		at Creighton	L 72–81	11–4 (3–1)	Omaha Civic Auditorium; Omaha, Nebraska
Jan 14, 2001		Wichita State	W 92–68	12–4 (4–1)	Hulman Center; Terre Haute, Indiana
Jan 17, 2001		at Evansville	W 77–66	13–4 (5–1)	Roberts Stadium; Evansville, Indiana
Jan 20, 2001		at Southern Illinois	L 65–68	13–5 (5–2)	SIU Arena; Carbondale, Illinois
Jan 23, 2001		Drake	W 72–61	14–5 (6–2)	Hulman Center; Terre Haute, Indiana
Jan 27, 2001		at Wichita State	W 85–67	15–5 (7–2)	Levitt Arena; Wichita, Kansas
Jan 31, 2001		SW Missouri State	W 80–64	16–5 (8–2)	Hulman Center; Terre Haute, Indiana
Feb 4, 2001*		Creighton	L 71–77	16–6 (8–3)	Hulman Center; Terre Haute, Indiana
Feb 7, 2001		at Northern Iowa	L 60–67	16–7 (8–4)	UNI-Dome; Cedar Falls, Iowa
Feb 10, 2001		Illinois State	W 74–68	17–7 (9–4)	Hulman Center; Terre Haute, Indiana
Feb 15, 2001		at Drake	L 71–83	17–8 (9–5)	Knapp Center; Des Moines, Iowa
Feb 17, 2001		at Bradley	L 60–62	17–9 (9–6)	Carver Arena; Peoria, Illinois
Feb 21, 2001		Evansville	W 78–42	18–9 (10–6)	Hulman Center; Terre Haute, Indiana
Feb 24, 2001		at SW Missouri State	L 64–69	18–10 (10–7)	Hammons Student Center; Springfield, Missouri
Feb 26, 2001		Southern Illinois	L 59–61	18–11 (10–8)	Hulman Center; Terre Haute, Indiana
Missouri Valley tournament
Mar 3, 2001*		vs. Southern Illinois; Quarterfinals	W 67–64	19–11	Savvis Center; St. Louis, Missouri
Mar 4, 2001*		vs. Creighton; Semifinals	W 87–74	20–11	Savvis Center; St. Louis, Missouri
Mar 5, 2001*		vs. Bradley; Championship game	W 69–63	21–11	Savvis Center; St. Louis, Missouri
2000 NCAA tournament
Mar 16, 2001*	(13 S)	vs. (4 S) No. 13 Oklahoma; First Round	W 70–68 ^{OT}	22–11	Pyramid Arena; Memphis, Tennessee
Mar 18, 2001*	(13 S)	vs. (12 S) Gonzaga; Second Round	L 68–85	22–12	Pyramid Arena; Memphis, Tennessee
*Non-conference game. ^{#}Rankings from AP Poll. (#) Tournament seedings in parentheses. S=South.
