= 2000–01 Creighton Bluejays men's basketball team =

American college basketball season

2000–01 Creighton Bluejays men's basketball
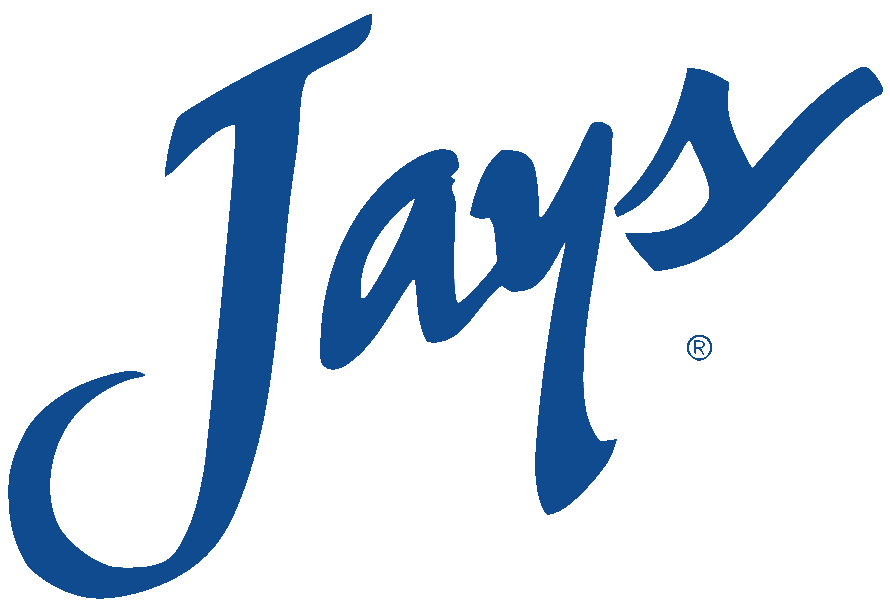

MVC regular season champion

NCAA tournament, first round
- Conference: Missouri Valley Conference
- Record: 24–8 (14–4 MVC)
- Head coach: Dana Altman (7th year)
- Assistant coaches: Greg Grensing (7th year); Len Gordy (7th year); Darian DeVries (3rd year)
- Home arena: Omaha Civic Auditorium

2000–01 Missouri Valley Conference men's basketball standings
	Conf.				Overall
Team	W		L	PCT	W		L	PCT
Creighton	14	–	4	.778	24	–	8	.750
Bradley	12	–	6	.667	19	–	12	.613
Illinois State	12	–	6	.667	21	–	9	.700
Southern Illinois	10	–	8	.556	16	–	14	.533
Indiana State †	10	–	8	.556	22	–	12	.647
Evansville	9	–	9	.500	14	–	16	.467
Drake	8	–	10	.444	12	–	16	.429
Southwest Missouri State	8	–	10	.444	13	–	16	.448
Wichita State	4	–	14	.222	9	–	19	.321
Northern Iowa	3	–	15	.167	7	–	24	.226
† 2001 MVC tournament winner Rankings from AP Poll

The 2000–01 Creighton Bluejays men's basketball team represented Creighton University during the 2000–01 NCAA Division I men's basketball season. The Bluejays, led by head coach Dana Altman, played their home games at the Omaha Civic Auditorium. The Jays finished with a 24–8 record, and won the Missouri Valley Conference regular season title to earn an at-large bid to the 2001 NCAA tournament.

== Roster ==
2000–01 Creighton Bluejays men's basketball team
Players
Coaches

Pos.	#	Name	Height	Weight	Year	Previous school	Hometown
G	4	Ben Walker	6 ft 2 in (1.88 m)	205 lb (93 kg)	Sr	Oak Creek, WI
G	5	Ryan Sears	6 ft 0 in (1.83 m)	185 lb (84 kg)	Sr	Ankeny, IA
G	12	Ismael Caro	6 ft 0 in (1.83 m)	185 lb (84 kg)	Fr	Manchester, Connecticut
G/F	20	Larry House	6 ft 4 in (1.93 m)	205 lb (93 kg)	So	Milwaukee, Wisconsin
C	21	Joe Dabbert	6 ft 11 in (2.11 m)	255 lb (116 kg)	Fr	Bailey, Colorado
F	22	Michael Lindeman	6 ft 6 in (1.98 m)	200 lb (91 kg)	Fr	Iowa Falls, Iowa
G	23	Terrell Taylor	6 ft 3 in (1.91 m)	200 lb (91 kg)	So	Bridgeport, CT
F	25	Kyle Korver	6 ft 7 in (2.01 m)	210 lb (95 kg)	So	Pella, IA
F	34	Mike Grimes	6 ft 7 in (2.01 m)	225 lb (102 kg)	Fr	Florissant, Missouri
F	43	Brody Deren	6 ft 8 in (2.03 m)	250 lb (113 kg)	Fr	Harlan, Iowa
F	44	Austin Collier	6 ft 7 in (2.01 m)	205 lb (93 kg)	So	Tucson, Arizona

Head coach

- Dana Altman (Eastern New Mexico)

Assistant coach(es)

- Greg Grensing
- Len Gordy
- Darian DeVries (Northern Iowa)

Legend

- (C) Team captain
- (S) Suspended
- (I) Ineligible
- (W) Walk-on
- Injured
- Current redshirt

== Schedule ==
Date time, TV	Rank^{#}	Opponent^{#}	Result	Record	Site (attendance) city, state
Regular season
Nov 20, 2000*		Western Illinois	W 96–50	1–0	Omaha Civic Auditorium; Omaha, NE
Nov 24, 2000*		vs. Cleveland State; Energia Systems Thanksgiving Tournament	W 66–59	2–0	Municipal Auditorium; Kansas City, MO
Nov 25, 2000*		vs. Providence; Energia Systems Thanksgiving Tournament	W 63–51	3–0	Municipal Auditorium; Kansas City, MO
Nov 26, 2000*		vs. Toledo; Energia Systems Thanksgiving Tournament	L 57–61	3–1	Municipal Auditorium; Kansas City, MO
Dec 1, 2000*		at Wyoming	L 74–78	3–2	Arena-Auditorium; Laramie, WY
Dec 6, 2000*		Colorado State	W 74–51	4–2	Omaha Civic Auditorium; Omaha, NE
Dec 9, 2000*		Georgia State	W 81–74	5–2	Omaha Civic Auditorium; Omaha, NE
Dec 16, 2000		Wichita State	W 74–64	6–2 (1–0)	Omaha Civic Auditorium; Omaha, NE
Dec 19, 2000*		at Tulsa	W 86–76	7–2	Reynolds Center; Tulsa, OK
Dec 23, 2000*		Mississippi Valley State	W 89–82	8–2	Omaha Civic Auditorium; Omaha, NE
Dec 30, 2000		Evansville	W 87–57	9–2 (2–0)	Omaha Civic Auditorium; Omaha, NE
Jan 2, 2001*		at Nebraska; Rivalry	W 62–51	10–2	Bob Devaney Sports Center; Lincoln, NE
Jan 6, 2001		at Bradley	L 68–73 ^{OT}	10–3 (2–1)	Carver Arena; Peoria, IL
Jan 8, 2001		at Illinois State	L 63–75	10–4 (2–2)	Redbird Arena; Normal, IL
Jan 11, 2001		Indiana State	W 81–72	11–4 (3–2)	Omaha Civic Auditorium; Omaha, NE
Jan 14, 2001		Northern Iowa	W 80–56	12–4 (4–2)	Omaha Civic Auditorium; Omaha, NE
Jan 17, 2001		at Missouri State	L 67–74	12–5 (4–3)	Hammons Student Center; Springfield, MO
Jan 20, 2001		at Wichita State	W 56–52	13–5 (5–3)	Levitt Arena; Wichita, KS
Jan 24, 2001		at Evansville	L 52–61	13–6 (5–4)	Roberts Municipal Stadium; Evansville, IN
Jan 27, 2001		Illinois State	W 78–69	14–6 (6–4)	Omaha Civic Auditorium; Omaha, NE
Jan 31, 2001		Southern Illinois	W 78–63	15–6 (7–4)	Omaha Civic Auditorium; Omaha, NE
Feb 4, 2001		at Indiana State	W 77–71	16–6 (8–4)	Hulman Center; Terre Haute, IN
Feb 7, 2001		Drake	W 69–44	17–6 (9–4)	Omaha Civic Auditorium; Omaha, NE
Feb 10, 2001		at Southern Illinois	W 77–63	18–6 (10–4)	SIU Arena; Carbondale, IL
Feb 14, 2001		Bradley	W 74–60	19–6 (11–4)	Omaha Civic Auditorium; Omaha, NE
Feb 17, 2001*		Wyoming	W 84–72	20–6	Omaha Civic Auditorium; Omaha, NE
Feb 21, 2001		at Northern Iowa	W 69–50	21–6 (12–4)	UNI-Dome; Cedar Falls, IA
Feb 24, 2001		at Drake	W 78–70	22–6 (13–4)	Knapp Center; Des Moines, IA
Feb 26, 2001		Missouri State	W 72–48	23–6 (14–4)	Omaha Civic Auditorium; Omaha, NE
Missouri Valley Conference tournament
Mar 3, 2001*		vs. Missouri State; MVC Tournament Quarterfinal	W 63–41	24–6	Savvis Center; St. Louis, MO
Mar 4, 2001*		vs. Indiana State; MVC Tournament Semifinal	L 74–87	24–7	Savvis Center; St. Louis, MO
2001 NCAA tournament
03/15/2001; CBS	(10)	vs. (7) No. 24 Iowa; First Round	L 56–69	24–8	Nassau Veterans Memorial Coliseum (-); Uniondale, NY
*Non-conference game. ^{#}Rankings from AP. (#) Tournament seedings in parentheses. E=East. All times are in Central.
