= 2001 Missouri Valley Conference men's basketball tournament =

- Classification: Division I
- Season: 2000–01
- Teams: 10
- Site: Savvis Center; St. Louis, Missouri
- Champions: Indiana State (2nd title)
- Winning coach: Royce Waltman (1st title)
- MVP: Michael Menser (Indiana State)

2000–01 Missouri Valley Conference men's basketball standings
	Conf.				Overall
Team	W		L	PCT	W		L	PCT
Creighton	14	–	4	.778	24	–	8	.750
Bradley	12	–	6	.667	19	–	12	.613
Illinois State	12	–	6	.667	21	–	9	.700
Southern Illinois	10	–	8	.556	16	–	14	.533
Indiana State †	10	–	8	.556	22	–	12	.647
Evansville	9	–	9	.500	14	–	16	.467
Drake	8	–	10	.444	12	–	16	.429
Southwest Missouri State	8	–	10	.444	13	–	16	.448
Wichita State	4	–	14	.222	9	–	19	.321
Northern Iowa	3	–	15	.167	7	–	24	.226
† 2001 MVC tournament winner Rankings from AP Poll

The 2001 Missouri Valley Conference men's basketball tournament was played in St. Louis, Missouri at the conclusion of the 2000–2001 regular season.

== Tournament Bracket ==
Opening Round; Thursday, March 2
8	Southwest Missouri State	57
9	Wichita State	45
7	Drake	53
10	Northern Iowa	59

Quarterfinals; Friday, March 3
1	Creighton	63
8	Southwest Missouri State	41
4	Southern Illinois	64
5	Indiana State	67
2	Bradley	59
10	Northern Iowa	56
3	Illinois State	81
6	Evansville	77

Semifinals; Saturday, March 4
1	Creighton	74
5	Indiana State	87
2	Bradley	73
3	Illinois State	66

Final; Sunday, March 5
5	Indiana State	69
2	Bradley	63

== See also ==
- Missouri Valley Conference
