= Roy "Goose" Burris =

American basketball player

Roy Burris
Personal information
- Born: April 12, 1901 Washington, Indiana, U.S.
- Died: February 1, 1990 (aged 88) Barberton, Ohio, U.S.
- Listed height: 5 ft 10 in (1.78 m)
- Listed weight: 150 lb (68 kg)

Career information
- High school: Washington (Washington, Indiana)
- College: Indiana State (1921–1924)
- Playing career: 1926–1934
- Position: Point guard / shooting guard
- Number: 29

Career history
- 1926–1927: Flint Buicks
- 1927–1928: Flint Big Reds
- 1928–1934: Akron Firestones

Career highlights
- NPBL champion (1933)

Roy H. "Goose" Burris (April 12, 1901 – February 1, 1990) was an American professional basketball player for the Akron Firestones. He played college basketball for the Indiana State Sycamores, where he was twice named an Indiana College All-Star. Burris also had a brief career in Minor League Baseball, spending the 1928 season with the Cedar Rapids Bunnies.

== Early life ==
Burris was born in Washington, Indiana and attended Washington High, he averaged 11.9 points a contest, while being named the Evansville Courier Player of the Year. In his senior season (1920–21), Burris set a school record of 58 points in one game (against Paxton High School), earning all-state first-team accolades; the 58-point game also tied the state record. He finished his high school career as the school's leading scorer (1,124) and games played (94).

== College career ==
He made an immediate impact as a freshman at Indiana State (1921–22), appearing in all 15 games (9 starts) and averaging 5.3 points a contest. He was the only freshman in the Indiana Intercollegiate Conference to complete the 1921–22 season with at least 40 two-pointers made (41) and 30 free throws (32). In 1922–23, Burris led the team in scoring and a record of 20–5. As a junior, Burris again led the team in scoring, a record of 16–7. He was also named to the Indiana Collegiate All-Star team. Before his senior season he was declared ineligible because of his participation in a professional baseball camp tryout a month before.
