= Ívar DeCarsta Webster =

American-Icelandic basketball player and coach

Personal information
- Born: May 7, 1955 (age 71) Philadelphia, Pennsylvania
- Listed height: 211 cm (6 ft 11 in)
- Listed weight: 230 lb (104 kg)

Career information
- High school: Germantown (Philadelphia, Pennsylvania)
- College: Miami Dade (1974–1975); Indiana State (1975–1978)
- NBA draft: 1978: undrafted
- Playing career: 1979–1999
- Position: Center
- Number: 13
- Coaching career: 1979–2004

Career history

Playing
- 1979: KR
- 1979–1981: Skallagrímur
- 1981–1986: Haukar
- 1986–1987: Þór Akureyri
- 1987–1988: Haukar
- 1988–1989: KR
- 1989–1990: Haukar
- 1990–1991: UÍA
- 1991: KR
- 1992: ÍR
- 1992–1994: Breiðablik
- 1994–1996: Valur
- 1998–1999: Valur

Coaching
- 1979–1982: Skallagrímur
- 1983–1984: Haukar (assistant)
- 1986–1987: Þór Akureyri
- 1990–1991: UÍA
- 2003–2004: Wilmington College (assistant)

Career highlights
- As player: Icelandic league champion (1988); 2× Icelandic Basketball Cup (1985, 1986); Icelandic Division I champion (1983); Úrvalsdeild Defensive Player of the Year (1986); Úrvalsdeild rebounding leader (1989)

Ívar DeCarsta Unsont Webster (born May 7, 1955) is an American and Icelandic former professional basketball player and coach. Following a college career at Miami Dade and Indiana State, he went on to play for 20 seasons in Iceland where he won the national championship in 1988. In 1984, he became the first naturalized citizen to play for Iceland national basketball team.

== College ==
Webster played for Indiana State from 1975 to 1978, where he was a roommate of Larry Bird. During the 1975–1976 season, he finished sixth in the nation in rebounds. He is the schools all-time leader in blocked shots (168) and third in rebounds (862).

== Iceland ==
Webster joined defending Icelandic national champions KR in September 1979. After a disappointing offensive performance in the annual Reykjavík tournament, he played one game for KR in the FIBA European Cup Winners' Cup before leaving in November to join Division I club Skallagrímur as player-coach.

In 1981, Webster joined Haukar and helped them win Division I in 1983 and achieve promotion to Úrvalsdeild karla.

In 1983, foreign players where barred from playing in the Icelandic leagues. Even though Webster was married to an Icelandic woman, with whom he had a child, he did not have an Icelandic citizenship and thus could not play in domestic matches. He received his Icelandic citizenship in May 1984 and took up the Icelandic first name Ívar.

In 1985, Webster was a key member of the Haukar team that won the Icelandic Basketball Cup for the first time in the club's history. He scored 26 points in Haukar's 73–71 victory over KR. Haukar defended the title in 1986 by defeating Njarðvík 93–92 in the cup finals, with Webster scoring a game high 28 points. After the season he was named the Úrvalsdeild Defensive Player of the Year.

Webster spent the 1986–87 season as a player-coach with Division I club Þór Akureyri. For the season he averaged 21.7 points in 20 games.

He rejoined Haukar in 1987 In February 1988, Webster was handed a seven-week suspension from the Icelandic Basketball Association disciplinary court for punching Breiðablik's player Björn Hjörleifsson on December 12, 1987. Webster was upset with the length of the suspension and the fact that it took almost two months to reach a verdict and as a result, declined to play again for the national team, which is run by the Association. Haukar appealed the verdict to the National Olympic and Sports Association of Iceland which overturned it on March 11, allowing Webster to play again. A relieved Webster rescinded his decision to not play with the national team again. With Webster back, Haukar made it to the Úrvalsdeild finals against Njarðvík. Haukar won the series 3–0 after beating Njarðvík 92–91 in double overtime in the third game. Webster scored 6 points in the deciding game and blocked Friðrik Ragnarsson's potential game winning shot at the end of the first overtime.

Webster joined KR again for the 1988–1989 season and helped them to the third best record in the Úrvalsdeild while leading the league in rebounds per game. In the playoffs KR surprised many by sweeping top seeded Njarðvík in the semi-finals, paving the way for Webster's second straight trip to the Úrvalsdeild finals. In the finals, KR met Keflavík. After splitting the first two games of the series, KR was no match for Keflavík in the third and deciding game, losing 89–72. In June, Webster left KR and rejoined Haukar once again.

== Return to USA ==
Webster served as an assistant coach at Wilmington College for the 2003–2004 season.

== Icelandic national basketball team ==
Between 1984 and 1987, Webster played 37 games for the Icelandic national basketball team. He was the first foreigner to play for the national team.

== Television and film ==
Webster had a roles in the 1984 film Gullsandur and the 1989 Icelandic film Under the Glacier (Icelandic: Kristnihald undir Jökli) as well as an appearance in the Áramótaskaupið.

=== Filmography ===
- 1984: Gullsandur
- 1986: Stella í orlofi
- 1989: Under the Glacier
