= Butch Wade =

American basketball player (1945–2018)

Personal information
- Born: June 6, 1945 Columbus, Indiana, U.S.
- Died: September 16, 2018 (aged 73) Columbus, Indiana, U.S.
- Listed height: 6 ft 4 in (1.93 m)
- Listed weight: 205 lb (93 kg)

Career information
- High school: Columbus (Columbus, Indiana)
- College: Indiana State (1964–1967)
- NBA draft: 1967: 7th round, 72nd overall pick
- Drafted by: New York Knicks
- Position: Guard

Career highlights
- 2× College Division All-American – UPI (1965, 1967); College Division All-American – AP (1965); ICC Most Valuable Player (1967); 3× First-team All-ICC (1966–1968); Indiana Basketball Hall of Fame (2016)
- Stats at Basketball Reference

Charles "Butch" Wade (June 6, 1945 – September 16, 2018) was an American collegiate basketball player. He was a member of the Indiana Basketball Hall of Fame, and the Indiana State University Athletic Hall of Fame.

== High school career ==
Born in Columbus, Indiana, Butch Wade attended Columbus High School (which was renamed Columbus North High School in 1973). He led the Bulldogs to an undefeated regular season in 1963; they finished the year at 25–1, including an IHSAA Sectional and Regional titles to reach the 3rd round (Sweet 16) of the State Tourney. They lost to the eventual State Champion Muncie Bearcats, 70–79 in the first round of the Semi-State (Sweet 16). He was selected for the All-State Team.

== College career ==
After high school, Wade attended Indiana State University. He played basketball under head coach Duane Klueh; leading the team in scoring and rebounding his entire career; he finished his career as the #1 career scorer and the #1 rebounder. He held the career marks for Field Goals (FGs) and Free Throws (FTs), he also held the highest single game scoring mark (43 points). He helped lead the Sycamores to two consecutive Indiana Collegiate Conference Championships and two NCAA College Division (now Division II) Tournaments. He was part of the "Columbus Connection," as he and two fellow Columbus teammates—Jerry Newsom and Steve Hollenbeck) all played at Indiana State. These three players led the Sycamores to a record of 46–11 during their two seasons of varsity play. In his senior year, he led the Sycamores in scoring with 27.3 points a game while being named a Consensus All-American, and received his third straight First Team All-ICC selection. He was named the MVP of the Steel Bowl tournament in December 1966, the Sycamores were the finalists, dropping a hard-fought contest to Columbia. He was a 2nd team All-American following his sophomore season.

As a junior, Wade led the Sycamores to a record of 22–4 and the 1966 NCAA Men's Division II Basketball Tournament; his senior season, they were equally successful, finishing with a record of 20–4 and returned to the 1967 NCAA Men's Division II Basketball Tournament.

== Professional career ==
Butch Wade was selected as the 72nd overall pick in the 1967 NBA draft by the New York Knicks. He was also drafted by the Oakland Oaks of the ABA in the 1967 draft. He did not appear in a game but went on to a successful twenty-year career in education in his hometown. He was a health and physical education teacher for Bartholomew Consolidated School Corp. from 1985 to 2005. He spent 10 years as a boys varsity assistant coach at Columbus North, two years as girls varsity coach at Columbus North and 16 years as a coach at Central Middle School.
