= Jerry Newsom =

American basketball player

Personal information
- Born: May 29, 1946 (age 80) Columbus, Indiana, U.S.
- Listed height: 6 ft 7 in (2.01 m)
- Listed weight: 205 lb (93 kg)

Career information
- High school: Columbus (Columbus, Indiana)
- College: Indiana State (1964–1968)
- NBA draft: 1968: 6th round, 74th overall pick
- Drafted by: Boston Celtics
- Position: Forward

Career highlights
- NCAA Division II Tournament MOP (1968); First-team All-American (1968); Second-team All-American (1967); 3× first-team All-ICC (1966–1968); No. 41 jersey retired by Indiana State Sycamores
- Stats at Basketball Reference

Jerry Newsom (born May 19, 1946) is an American former college basketball player.

== High school career ==
=== Columbus ===
Born in Columbus, Indiana, Jerry Newsom attended Columbus High School. He led the Bulldogs to consecutive undefeated seasons in 1963 and 1964; reaching the State Finals in 1964. He led the state in scoring during his Senior year averaging 28 points a game, with a total of 1,325 points in his high school career. He was a member of the Indiana All-Star Team. He fell short of winning the Indiana Mr. Basketball Award to Dennis Brady.

== College career ==
=== Indiana State ===
After high school, Jerry attended Indiana State University, located in Terre Haute, Indiana. He played basketball under head coach Duane Klueh and Gordon Stauffer; leading the team in scoring and rebounding his entire career; he finished his career as the #1 career scorer (he's now #3) and the #1 rebounder (#2 behind Larry Bird). He helped lead the Sycamores to three consecutive ICC Championships and three NCAA College Division (now Division II) Tournaments. He was part of the "Columbus Connection," as he and fellow Columbus teammates—Joe Warfel, Butch Wade and Steve Hollenbeck) all played at Indiana State. These three players led the Sycamores to a record of 46-11 during their two seasons of varsity play. Wade, a year older than Hollenbeck and Newsom, graduated in 1967. In his Senior year, he led the Sycamores in scoring with 27.3 points a game while being named a Consensus All-American, and received his third straight First Team All-ICC selection. He was a 2nd team All-American following his sophomore season. Jerry scored a career high 41 points on January 10, 1966, against Eastern Illinois, the second most in school history, (at that time) only behind Butch Wade's 43. With 2,147 career points he was the first of three Sycamores to reach the 2,000 point plateau, along with Larry Bird and John Sherman Williams.

In 1968, his senior season, Jerry led the Sycamores to the Championship game of the 1968 NCAA Men's Division II Basketball Tournament; he was named Tournament MVP and to the All-Tourney team; the Sycamores couldn't withstand a furious rally by Kentucky Wesleyan.

== Professional career ==
=== Boston Celtics & Indiana Pacers ===
Jerry Newsom was selected as the 74th overall pick in the 1968 NBA draft by the Boston Celtics; he was also drafted by the Indiana Pacers in the 1968 ABA Draft, during the 6th-10th rounds. He did not appear in a professional game but went on to a successful business career in his hometown. He obtained his referee license in order to remain involved in basketball and became a highly respected IHSAA referee.
