= 2000–01 Illinois State Redbirds men's basketball team =

American college basketball season

2000–01 Illinois State Redbirds men's basketball

NIT, First Round
- Conference: Missouri Valley Conference
- Record: 21–9 (12–6 MVC)
- Head coach: Tom Richardson (2nd season)
- Assistant coaches: Doug Novsek; Chad Altadonna; Anthony Beane
- Home arena: Redbird Arena

2000–01 Missouri Valley Conference men's basketball standings
	Conf.				Overall
Team	W		L	PCT	W		L	PCT
Creighton	14	–	4	.778	24	–	8	.750
Bradley	12	–	6	.667	19	–	12	.613
Illinois State	12	–	6	.667	21	–	9	.700
Southern Illinois	10	–	8	.556	16	–	14	.533
Indiana State †	10	–	8	.556	22	–	12	.647
Evansville	9	–	9	.500	14	–	16	.467
Drake	8	–	10	.444	12	–	16	.429
Southwest Missouri State	8	–	10	.444	13	–	16	.448
Wichita State	4	–	14	.222	9	–	19	.321
Northern Iowa	3	–	15	.167	7	–	24	.226
† 2001 MVC tournament winner Rankings from AP Poll

The 2000–01 Illinois State Redbirds men's basketball team represented Illinois State University during the 2000–01 NCAA Division I men's basketball season. The Redbirds, led by second year head coach Tom Richardson, played their home games at Redbird Arena and were a member of the Missouri Valley Conference.

The Redbirds finished the season 21–9, 12–6 in conference play to finish in a tie for second place with Bradley University. They were the number three seed for the Missouri Valley Conference tournament. They won their quarterfinal game versus the University of Evansville and lost their semifinal game versus Bradley University.

The Redbirds received an at-large bid to the 2001 National Invitation Tournament. They were defeated by Purdue University in the first round.

== Roster ==
2000–01 Illinois State Redbirds men's basketball team
Players
Coaches

Pos.	#	Name	Height	Weight	Year	Hometown
F	54	Dan Luczywko	6 ft 8 in (2.03 m)	—	RS Sr	South Milwaukee, WI
F	40	Rich Beyers	6 ft 8 in (2.03 m)	—	Sr	Shelbyville, IL
G	12	Tarise Bryson	6 ft 1 in (1.85 m)	—	Jr	Decatur, IL
F	33	Shedrick Ford	6 ft 4 in (1.93 m)	—	Jr	Macon, GA
G	21	Shawn Jeppson	6 ft 2 in (1.88 m)	—	Jr	Spring Valley, IL
F	31	Chad Mazanowski	6 ft 6 in (1.98 m)	—	Jr	DeKalb, IL
G	15	Randy Rice	6 ft 0 in (1.83 m)	—	Jr	Springfield, IL
G	23	Traves Wilson	6 ft 3 in (1.91 m)	—	RS So	Moline, IL
F	44	Brett Gillan	6 ft 5 in (1.96 m)	—	So	Normal, IL
G	3	Ishmael Joyce	6 ft 2 in (1.88 m)	—	So	Memphis, TN
C	5	Andy Strandmark	6 ft 11 in (2.11 m)	—	So	Geneseo, IL
F	32	Jason Hammock	6 ft 6 in (1.98 m)	—	Fr	The Colony, TX
F	1	Cedric Knight	6 ft 6 in (1.98 m)	—	Fr	Louisville, KY
F	4	Dirk Williams	6 ft 8 in (2.03 m)	—	Fr	Pekin, IL

Head coach

- Tom Richardson (Saint Xavier)

Assistant coach(es)

- Doug Novsek (Southern Illinois)
- Chad Altadonna (Illinois State)
- Anthony Beane (Kansas State)

Legend

- (C) Team captain
- (S) Suspended
- (I) Ineligible
- (W) Walk-on
- Injured
- Current redshirt

== Schedule ==
Date time, TV	Rank^{#}	Opponent^{#}	Result	Record	High points	High rebounds	High assists	Site (attendance) city, state
Regular Season
November 25, 2000*		Chicago State	W 88–46	1–0	16 – Bryson	–	4 – Jeppson, Rice, Knight	Redbird Arena (5,506); Normal, IL
November 30, 2000*; 7:00 pm		at No. 2 Kansas	L 61–80	1–1	14 – Jeppson	7 – Wilson	2 – Bryson, Ford, Rice	Allen Fieldhouse (16,100); Lawrence, KS
December 3, 2000*		at Central Michigan	W 85–73	2–1	41 – Bryson	8 – Wilson	4 – Bryson	Rose Arena (4,158); Mount Pleasant, MI
December 6, 2000*		Bowling Green State	W 83–73	3–1	20 – Bryson	7 – Knight	5 – Rice	Redbird Arena (7,045); Normal, IL
December 9, 2000*		Tennessee–Martin	W 77–60	4–1	16 – Bryson	10 – Ford	5 – Rice	Redbird Arena (7,470); Normal, IL
December 17, 2000*		Texas–San Antonio	W 95–87	5–1	20 – Bryson	6 – Ford	6 – Rice	Redbird Arena (5,727); Normal, IL
December 23, 2000*		Indiana/Purdue–Indianapolis	W 82–63	6–1	17 – Bryson	9 – Beyers	4 – Bryson	Redbird Arena (5,355); Normal, IL
December 28, 2000*		Georgia Southern	W 89–60	7–1	31 – Bryson	6 – Ford	5 – Rice, Wilson	Redbird Arena (6,245); Normal, IL
December 31, 2000*		at Western Illinois	W 87–83 ^{OT}	8–1	25 – Ford	9 – Williams	2 – Bryson, Jeppson, Rice	Western Hall (1,214); Macomb, IL
January 6, 2001		Indiana State	L 71–78	8–2 (0–1)	26 – Bryson	7 – Wilson	5 – Rice	Redbird Arena (6,477); Normal, IL
January 8, 2001; 7:05 pm		Creighton	W 75–63	9–2 (1–1)	21 – Ford	10 – Ford	7 – Bryson	Redbird Arena (5,225); Normal, IL
January 11, 2001		at Southwest Missouri State	W 63–62	10–2 (2–1)	19 – Jeppson	6 – Jeppson	2 – Jeppson, Rice, Wilson	John Q. Hammons Student Center (6,302); Springfield, MO
January 14, 2001; 2:05 pm		at Southern Illinois	W 88–74	11–2 (3–1)	35 – Bryson	5 – Ford, Rice	9 – Jeppson	SIU Arena (4,189); Carbondale, IL
January 17, 2001		at Drake	L 68–77	11–3 (3–2)	16 – Ford	6 – Ford	2 – Ford, Jeppson, Rice	The Knapp Center (2,568); Des Moines, IA
January 20, 2001		Evansville	W 64–60	12–3 (4–2)	19 – Bryson	13 – Williams	5 – Wilson	Redbird Arena (9,125); Normal, IL
January 24, 2001		Southwest Missouri State	W 64–60	13–3 (5–2)	19 – Bryson	6 – Knight	9 – Rice	Redbird Arena (6,447); Normal, IL
January 27, 2001; 7:05 pm		at Creighton	L 69–78	13–4 (5–3)	23 – Bryson	7 – Bryson, Ford	3 – Bryson	Omaha Civic Auditorium (8,371); Omaha, NE
January 29, 2001; 7:05 pm		at Wichita State	W 68–61	14–4 (6–3)	27 – Bryson	7 – Jeppson	5 – Bryson, Rice	Henry Levitt Arena (7,312); Wichita, KS
February 3, 2001		Northern Iowa	W 64–52	15–4 (7–3)	17 – Bryson	10 – Knight	6 – Rice	Redbird Arena (9,128); Normal, IL
February 6, 2001; WMBD		Bradley	W 81–62	16–4 (8–3)	27 – Bryson	15 – Ford	5 – Jeppson	Redbird Arena (9,417); Normal, IL
February 10, 2001		at Indiana State	L 68-74	16–5 (8–4)	24 – Bryson	9 – Ford	4 – Rice	Hulman Center (7,339); Terre Haute, IN
February 12, 2001		at Evansville	W 94–87 ^{2OT}	17–5 (9–4)	37 – Bryson	8 – Rice	13 – Rice	Roberts Municipal Stadium (6,334); Evansville, IN
February 15, 2001; 7:05 pm		Southern Illinois	W 69–60	18–5 (10–4)	30 – Bryson	6 – Ford	8 – Rice	Redbird Arena (7,059); Normal, IL
February 18, 2001		Drake	L 78–81	18–6 (10–5)	30 – Bryson	6 – Bryson, Ford	4 – Jeppson	Redbird Arena (9,212); Normal, IL
February 21, 2001; WEEK		at Bradley	L 52–64	18–7 (10–6)	20 – Bryson	6 – Ford, Jeppson	2 – Bryson, Ford, Jeppson	Carver Arena (11,309); Peoria, IL
February 24, 2001		at Northern Iowa	W 69–66	19–7 (11–6)	20 – Bryson	8 – Beyers, Bryson	5 – Bryson, Rice	UNI Dome (2,531); Cedar Falls, IA
February 26, 2001; 7:05 pm		Wichita State	W 79–71	20–7 (12–6)	28 – Bryson	8 – Ford	5 – Rice	Redbird Arena (6,264); Normal, IL
State Farm Missouri Valley Conference {MVC} tournament
March 3, 2001	(3)	vs. (6) Evansville; Quarterfinal	W 81–77	21–7	19 – Bryson, Jeppson	8 – Bryson	7 – Rice	Savvis Center (8,946); St. Louis, MO
March 4, 2001	(3)	vs. (2) Bradley; Semifinal	L 66–73	21–8	22 – Bryson	10 – Ford	6 – Rice	Savvis Center (10,709); St. Louis, MO
National Invitation {NIT} tournament
March 14, 2001; 6:30 pm		at Purdue; First Round	L 79–90	21–9	38 – Bryson	6 – Knight	6 – Rice	Mackey Arena (3,823); West Lafayette, IN
*Non-conference game. ^{#}Rankings from AP Poll. (#) Tournament seedings in parentheses. All times are in Central Standard Time.
