= Lorri Bauman =

American basketball player

Lorri A. Bauman
Personal information
- Listed height: 6 ft 3 in (1.91 m)

Career information
- High school: Des Moines East High School
- College: Drake (1981–1984)
- Position: Forward

Career highlights
- 2× All-Gateway (1983, 1984); MVC All-Centennial team (2007); No. 55 retired by Drake Bulldogs

Lorri A. Bauman is an American former basketball player for the Drake Bulldogs. She was the first woman in NCAA history to score 3,000 points and at one time held the record for NCAA Division 1 women's basketball points scored in a career; the record has been successively broken by Patricia Hoskins, Jackie Stiles, Kelsey Plum, Brittney Griner, Kelsey Mitchell and most recently Caitlin Clark also surpassing Bauman's career total.

== Early years ==
Bauman began playing basketball at age 10 in a Salvation Army league. She gained notoriety while playing for Des Moines East High School in the late 1970s. She scored 3,010 points in high school and led Des Moines East to Iowa state championship in 1979. She averaged 48 points a game as a high school senior.

== College career ==
Bauman played in 120 games at Drake from 1981 to 1984 and scored 3,115 points, an average of 26 points per game, and collected 1,050 rebounds. For more than 25 years, she has held multiple NCAA scoring records, including (1) most field goals in a game, having made 27 of 33 field goal attempts (82%) in a January 6, 1984 game between Drake and Missouri State, (2) most free throws in a season, having made 275 of 325 attempts (84.6%) in 1982, and (3) most free throws in a career, having made 907 of 1,090 attempts from 1981 to 1984. She was also the first woman in NCAA history to score 3,000 points. At the time of her graduation, Bauman was also the leading scorer in NCAA women's basketball history with 3,115 points in 1984. Her 1984 scoring total now ranks seventh on the all-time list. Her total of 58 points against Missouri State in January 1984 was previously the NCAA single-game scoring record and is now tied for third on the all-time list. Her career average of 26 points per game ranks fifth on the all-time list.

In 1982, Bauman scored 50 points against Maryland in the West Regional final, which remains the NCAA Tournament single-game scoring record (Maryland won that game, 89-78). She made 21 of 35 field goals and 8 of 11 free throws in the game. In January 2006, ESPN.com rated Bauman's 50-point game against Maryland as one of the top 25 moments of NCAA Tournament history.

Bauman's coach at Drake, Carole Baumgarten, later said of Bauman, "In my 12 years at Drake, she was the purest shooter that we ever had." Bauman developed a reputation for practicing little and relying on her natural shooting talent. Baumgarten recalled:

"There are not many players like that. I had great athletes at Drake who would work on their games all summer. Not Lorri. You couldn't get her there for a game in the summer. She was busy swimming or riding her motorcycle. She wasn't playing ball, and that's what was so amazing. Honest to God, she made the other kids crazy."

=== Drake statistics ===
Legend
GP	Games played	GS	Games started	MPG	Minutes per game
FG%	Field goal percentage	3P%	3-point field goal percentage	FT%	Free throw percentage
RPG	Rebounds per game	APG	Assists per game	SPG	Steals per game
BPG	Blocks per game	PPG	Points per game	**Bold**	Career high

Year	Team	GP	Points	FG%	FT%	RPG	PPG
1981	Drake	28	738	56.6%	80.3%	8.9	26.4
1982	Drake	**35**	**821**	53.2%	**84.6%**	9.2	23.5
1983	Drake	28	737	59.3%	83.3%	**9.4**	26.3
1984	Drake	29	819	**59.8%**	84.4%	7.4	**28.2**
Career		120	3115	57.2%	83.2%	8.8	26.0

== Later years ==
In 2005, Bauman was inducted into the Des Moines Sunday Register's Iowa Sports Hall of Fame. In 2007, Bauman's jersey was retired. At the time, Bauman said: "This has been one of the most fantastic weekends of my life."

In 2009, she was inducted into the Missouri Valley Conference Hall of Fame and was selected as an MVC Institutional Great.

== See also ==
- List of NCAA Division I women's basketball career scoring leaders
- List of NCAA Division I women's basketball players with 2,500 points and 1,000 rebounds
