= Devonte Brown =

American basketball player (born 1992)

No. 4 – BC Tallinna Kalev
- Position: Point guard
- League: Korvpalli Meistriliiga

Personal information
- Born: August 20, 1992 (age 34) LaPlace, Louisiana
- Listed height: 6 ft 3 in (1.91 m)
- Listed weight: 195 lb (88 kg)

Career information
- High school: Ellison (Killeen, Texas)
- College: Indiana State (2012–2016)
- NBA draft: 2016: undrafted
- Playing career: 2016–present

Career history
- 2016–2017: OKK Sloboda Tuzla
- 2017–2018: Paderborn Baskets
- 2018–present: BC Tallinna Kalev

Career highlights
- 2× Second-team All-MVC (2015, 2016); Most Improved Player(2015); Quad-Triple(2018)

Devonte Devon Brown (born August 20, 1992) is an American professional basketball player for BC Tallinna Kalev of the Estonian Korvpalli Meistriliiga. He is a 6 ft 3 in (1.93 m) tall point guard.

== College career ==
Brown played college basketball at Indiana State University, with the Sycamores, from 2011 to 2016; red-shirting in the 2011–12 season. He led the Sycamores to a 4-yr record of 71–59 (.546) and 2 post-season tournament berths (2x NIT).

He twice led the Sycamores in scoring and currently stands 24th in career scoring (1,170 pts), 10th in career defensive rebounds (371), 2nd in games played (130), 4th in made free throws (431), and 7th in minutes played (3,306).

== Professional career ==
After going undrafted in the 2016 NBA draft, Brown signed with OKK Sloboda Tuzla of the Premijer liga BiH; he started 21 of 29 games, averaging 7.9 points and leading them to a 17–13 record, good for fourth place in league play.

On June 19, 2017, Brown signed with German club Paderborn Baskets.

== Awards and accomplishments ==
=== College ===
- 2x All-Missouri Valley Conference Second Team: (2015, 2016)
- 2x Missouri Valley Conference Most Improved Player (2016)
- 2x NABC All-District Second Team: (2015, 2016)
- Missouri Valley Conference Player of the Week (2016)
