= Jayson Wells =

American basketball player and coach (born 1976)

Cal State Fullerton Titans
- Position: Assistant coach
- League: Big West Conference

Personal information
- Born: December 22, 1976 (age 49) Cleveland, Ohio, U.S.
- Listed height: 6 ft 8 in (2.03 m)
- Listed weight: 225 lb (102 kg)

Career information
- High school: Central Catholic (Cleveland, Ohio)
- College: Indiana State (1994–1998)
- NBA draft: 1998: undrafted
- Playing career: 1999–2010
- Coaching career: 2024–present

Career history

Playing
- 1998–1999: 08 Stockholm Human Rights
- 1999: Maccabi Ra'anana
- 1999–2000: Turun Piiloset
- 2000: Namika Lahti
- 2000–2001: Canberra Cannons
- 2001–2002: Basketball Löwen Braunschweig
- 2002–2003: Cairns Taipans
- 2003–2004: Ramat HaSharon / Haifa
- 2004: Pennsylvania ValleyDawgs
- 2004: Ulsan Mobis Phoebus
- 2004–2005: Hapoel Jerusalem B.C.
- 2005–2006: Ironi Nahariya
- 2006–2007: Orlandina Basket
- 2007: EiffelTowers Den Bosch
- 2007–2008: Hapoel Jerusalem B.C.
- 2008: Al Wasl
- 2008–2009: Poltava
- 2009: Atenas
- 2009–2010: Rishon LeZion

Coaching
- 2024–present: Cal State Fullerton

Career highlights
- Israeli Basketball Cup (2008); Second-team All-Israeli League (2006); Israeli Premier League Rebounding Leader (2004); Israeli League All-Newcomers team (2004); All-NBL Third Team (2001); 2× Finnish Basketball Cup winner (1999–2000); FIN-SWE League Champion (1999); All-Svenska Basketligan (1999); First-team All-MVC (1998); Third-team All-MVC (1997)

Jayson Donald Edward Wells (born December 22, 1976) is an American basketball coach and former player who is currently an assistant coach at Cal State Fullerton. As a player, he won titles in the Finnish, Ukrainian, and Israeli leagues and was named to four All-League teams.

== High school career ==
Born in Cleveland, Ohio, Wells attended Cleveland Central Catholic High School, graduating in 1994. He and teammate Earl Boykins led the Ironmen to a 23–2 season in 1994; reaching the Ohio State Quarterfinals; they won consecutive North Coast League titles. He was selected to the All-North Coast League “First Team” and named to the All-State Team (Honorable Mention).

== College career ==
After high school, Wells attended Indiana State University. He played basketball under head coaches Sherman Dillard and Royce Waltman, leading the team in scoring and rebounding his senior season; he finished his career as the #19 career scorer (1,106 points) and the #13 rebounder (508 total rebounds). He was named first team All-Missouri Valley following his senior season and third team All-Missouri Valley Conference junior season.

== Professional career ==
Jayson Wells was not selected in the 1998 NBA draft. However, he spent 13 seasons playing in 12 countries. He won titles in Finland, Ukraine, and Israel. He was selected to All-Pro teams in Sweden, Australia, and Israel. In 2003–04 he was the top rebounder in the Israel Basketball Premier League.

== Coaching career ==
In 2024 Wells accepted a position as an assistant coach at Cal State Fullerton.
