= Dwayne Lathan =

American professional basketball player (born 1989)

Personal information
- Born: January 20, 1989 (age 37) Ruston, Louisiana, U.S.
- Listed height: 6 ft 3 in (1.91 m)
- Listed weight: 190 lb (86 kg)

Career information
- High school: West Monroe (Monroe, Louisiana)
- College: Louisiana Tech (2007–2008); Indiana State (2009–2012)
- NBA draft: 2012: undrafted
- Playing career: 2012–present
- Position: Shooting guard

Career history
- 2012–2013: Osaka Evessa
- 2013–2014: Rio Grande Valley Vipers
- 2013–2014: North Dallas Vandals
- 2015–2016: Kentucky Mavericks
- 2016–2017: Sukhumi
- 2019: Hefei Yuanchuang

Dwayne Lathan (born January 20, 1989) is an American professional basketball player. He played college basketball at both Louisiana Tech University and Indiana State University.

== College career ==
Lathan, a 6'3" guard from West Monroe High School in Monroe, Louisiana, played one season at Louisiana Tech before transferring to Indiana State University. After sitting out 2008–09 season due to NCAA transfer rules, he played for the Indiana State Sycamores in Terre Haute, Indiana from 2009 to 2012. While there, Lathan was a two-year starter and as a junior in the 2010–11 season led the Sycamores to their first NCAA tournament appearance in 11 years. That year, Lathan averaged 10.9 points to lead the Sycamores in scoring. He also led them in scoring his senior season (2011–12) with 12.3 points per game and to an appearance in the 2012 CiT.

For his Indiana State career he scored 983 points and 58 three-pointers; starting 51 games and appearing in 83 games; led them in scoring for the 2010–11 and 2011–12 seasons. He was part of a MVC Tournament Championship team and made three post-season appearances.

== Professional career ==
Lathan went undrafted in the 2012 NBA draft. In October 2012, he signed with Osaka Evessa of Japan for the 2012–13 season. However, he didn't make his debut until December 2012.

On November 1, 2013, Lathan was selected in the 7th round of the 2013 NBA Development League draft by the Rio Grande Valley Vipers. On February 17, 2014, he was waived by the Vipers.

On November 22, 2015, Lathan was signed by the Kentucky Mavericks of the Premier Basketball League, based in Owensboro, Kentucky.
