= Golden Sands (film) =

- Directed by: Ágúst Guðmundsson
- Written by: Ágúst Guðmundsson
- Produced by: Ágúst Guðmundsson; Guðný Halldórsdóttir
- Cinematography: Sigurður Sverrir Pálsson
- Music by: Daryl Runswick
- Production company: Mannamyndir
- Release date: 26 December 1984
- Running time: 98 minutes
- Country: Iceland
- Language: Icelandic

Golden Sands (Icelandic: Gullsandur) is a 1984 Icelandic comedy film directed by Ágúst Guðmundsson, starring Arnar Jónsson, Edda Björgvinsdóttir and Pálmi Gestsson. It tells the story of a rumor about gold being hidden in the sands of south coast Iceland, which causes turbulence for the local community. The film was released in Icelandic cinemas on 26 December 1984.

== Cast ==
- Arnar Jónsson
- Edda Björgvinsdóttir
- Pálmi Gestsson
- Björgvin Halldórsson as Helgi Somi
- Jón Sigurbjörnsson
- Borgar Garðarsson
- Gestur Einar Jónasson
- Sigurður Sigurjónsson
- Ómar Ragnarsson
- Þórhallur Sigurðsson
- Haraldur Sigurðsson
