= Royce Waltman =

American basketball player and coach (1942–2014)

Biographical details
- Born: January 8, 1942; Ellerslie, Maryland, U.S.
- Died: April 7, 2014 (aged 72); Noblesville, Indiana, U.S.

Playing career
- 1960–1961: Pittsburgh
- 1961–1964: Slippery Rock

Coaching career (HC unless noted)
- 1965–1982: Bedford HS (PA)
- 1982–1987: Indiana (assistant)
- 1987–1992: DePauw
- 1992–1997: Indianapolis
- 1997–2007: Indiana State
- 2007–2008: Indianapolis
- 2008–2010: Roncalli HS (IN) (assistant)

Head coaching record
- Overall: 337–263 (college); 276–110 (high school)
- Tournaments: 1–2 (NCAA Division I); 1–2 (NCAA Division II); 4–3 (NCAA Division III)

Accomplishments and honors

Championships
- ICAC regular season (1990); GLVC regular season (1997); MVC regular season (2000); MVC tournament (2001)

Awards
- ICAC Coach of the Year (1990); 2× GLVC Coach of the Year (1996, 1997); MVC Coach of the Year (2000); DePauw Hall of Fame (2003); Bedford County Hall of Fame (2006); Univ. of Indianapolis Hall of Fame (2011); Indiana State University Hall of Fame (2023)

Royce Waltman (January 8, 1942 – April 7, 2014) was an American college basketball coach, best known for his time as head coach at Indiana State University from 1997 to 2007. Previously, he coached the University of Indianapolis from 1992 to 1997 and DePauw University from 1987 to 1992. He returned to coach Indianapolis for the 2007–8 season, before retiring.

He won 100 or more games at each school and led all three to the NCAA National Tournament; in addition, he led them all to conference regular and tournament championships. His career collegiate record was: 337–263 (.562).

Waltman entered the collegiate ranks after fifteen years as a high school basketball coach in Pennsylvania. He served an assistant coach on the staff of Bob Knight at Indiana University from the 1981–82 season through the Hoosiers' national championship campaign in 1986–87. Following his retirement from coaching, he returned to Bloomington as color commentator for Indiana basketball radio broadcasts. Waltman died at the age of 72 in 2014 after a period of declining health.

His influence and legacy is represented by the Waltman Coaching Tree, led by Clemson coach Brad Brownell, who played for him at DePauw and was his grad assistant at Indianapolis. Four of his Indiana State assistants became head coaches: Southeast Missouri State coach (and former Mississippi State coach) Rick Ray, Southern Indiana coach Stan Gouard, former Indiana State coach Greg Lansing, and former UM-Kansas City coach Kareem Richardson. His former DePauw assistant Mike McGrath is head coach at the University of Chicago, and his former Indianapolis assistant Todd Sturgeon succeeded him as head coach there, spending 10 years leading the Greyhounds. Long-time Waltman assistant Dick Bender is on Brownell's Clemson staff.

== Coaching career ==
=== Indiana State ===
It took just three seasons for Royce Waltman to return the Sycamores to the spotlight, attracting national attention unlike that since the fabled 1978–79 team danced to the NCAA Championship game. He was named as the 1999–2000 Missouri Valley Conference Coach of The Year.

In his fourth season at Indiana State, he directed the 2000–01 Sycamores to their first MVC Tournament Championship since the 1978–79 campaign – leading Indiana State to consecutive NCAA Tournament appearances, recording the University's first 20-win season in 21 years, and claiming outright possession of Indiana State's first MVC regular-season title over that same 21-year span.

During his ten seasons on the Sycamores’ sidelines, Waltman produced 14 All-MVC performers. In addition, 21 student-athletes garnered MVC All-Academic plaudits.

Under Waltman, the Sycamores achieved their first back-to-back winning seasons in 20 years during his first two seasons as head coach. In his third season, the team was predicted to compete for the 1999–2000 Missouri Valley Conference Championship and went on to win the outright MVC regular season title. Prior to his arrival at Indiana State, Waltman spent the previous decade rebuilding basketball programs at the University of Indianapolis and DePauw University.

=== Indianapolis ===
In his second season at the helm of the Greyhounds, Waltman's squad posted the program's first winning season in eight years, most wins since 1971–72, and most Great Lakes Valley Conference victories in school history. The following season his Greyhounds were nationally ranked for the first time in Division II and recorded back-to-back winning seasons for the first time in 23 years.

In 1995–96 Waltman's squad received the school's first-ever NCAA Division II Tournament bid after finishing 20–8 in the regular season. Indianapolis recorded a school-record 14 wins in the Great Lakes Valley Conference, and Waltman was selected as the GLVC Coach-of-the-Year. His team posted the school's first postseason win in 32 years in the first round of the NCAA Division II tournament. The Greyhounds were ranked 14th nationally at one point in the season.

In 1996–97, Waltman elevated his program to one of the premier basketball teams at the NCAA Division II level. The Greyhounds earned an in-season number-one ranking, eventually finishing as the No. 3 ranked team in the nation. Indianapolis captured the GLVC title with a school-record 23–5 record. For the second year, Waltman was selected by his peers as the GLVC Coach-of-the-Year, winning 16 games in conference and posting the school record winning streak (18). Waltman's 1996–97 Greyhounds also established school records for best NCAA Division II season record (23–5) and best NCAA Division II season winning percentage (.821).

Waltman's .645 winning percentage at Indianapolis ranks him as the second-winningest coach in the school's history.

=== DePauw ===
Prior to his stint at Indianapolis, Waltman was the head coach at DePauw University in Greencastle, Ind. During his tenure at that Division III institution, he compiled a record of 100–36. His 1989–90 squad captured the Indiana Collegiate Athletic Conference championship and were national runners-up. His teams were ranked number-one in the nation during both the 1988–89 and 1990–91 seasons.

He earned Indiana Collegiate Athletic Conference (ICAC) Coach of the Year honors in 1990 after leading the Tigers to the league championship. The 1991–92 team finished 20–7, making the school's third straight trip to the NCAA playoffs under his guidance. He led the Tigers to their first-ever NCAA Division III number-one ranking in January 1988, and his winning percentage of .730 is second in the school's history.

The 1989–90 team was inducted into the DePauw Athletic Hall of Fame in 2003.

== High school ==
Prior to becoming a collegiate coach, Waltman spent 15 years as head coach at Bedford High School in Bedford, Pennsylvania. During that tenure, he amassed an overall record of 276–110 and captured 11 league titles and seven district championships.

Coach Waltman returned to the high school ranks as an assistant coach; during the 2008–09 and 2009–10 seasons, he was on staff at Indianapolis Roncalli High School. The Rebels were 31–13 during his stint, with one sectional title.

== Head coaching record ==
Record table
Season	Team	Overall	Conference	Standing	Postseason
DePauw Tigers (Indiana Collegiate Athletic Conference) (1987–1992)
1987–88	DePauw	18–8	8–3		
1988–89	DePauw	18–8	7–3	2nd	
1989–90	DePauw	24–7	12–2	1st	NCAA Division III Runner-up
1990–91	DePauw	19–8	10–4	T–2nd	NCAA Division III Second Round
1991–92	DePauw	20–7	10–2	2nd	NCAA Division III First Round
DePauw:		99–38 (.722)	47–14 (.770)		
Indianapolis Greyhounds (Great Lakes Valley Conference) (1992–1997)
1992–93	Indianapolis	13–14	8–10	6th	
1993–94	Indianapolis	17–10	10–8	5th	
1994–95	Indianapolis	16–11	9–9	4th	
1995–96	Indianapolis	20–9	14–6	3rd	NCAA Division II Second Round
1996–97	Indianapolis	23–5	16–4	T–1st	NCAA Division II Second Round
Indiana State Sycamores (Missouri Valley Conference) (1997–2007)
1997–98	Indiana State	16–11	10–8	T–5th	
1998–99	Indiana State	15–12	10–8	T–5th	
1999–00	Indiana State	22–10	14–4	1st	NCAA Division I First Round
2000–01	Indiana State	22–12	10–8	T–4th	NCAA Division I Second Round
2001–02	Indiana State	6–22	4–14	T–9th	
2002–03	Indiana State	7–24	2–16	10th	
2003–04	Indiana State	9–19	5–13	T–8th	
2004–05	Indiana State	11–20	5–13	T–9th	
2005–06	Indiana State	13–16	4–14	T–9th	
2006–07	Indiana State	13–18	5–13	10th	
Indiana State:		134–164 (.450)	69–111 (.383)		
Indianapolis Greyhounds (Great Lakes Valley Conference) (2007–2008)
2007–08	Indianapolis	14–13	8–11	7th (East)	
Indianapolis:		103–62 (.624)	65–48 (.575)		
Total:		337–263 (.562)			
National champion Postseason invitational champion Conference regular season champion Conference regular season and conference tournament champion Division regular season champion Division regular season and conference tournament champion Conference tournament champion
