= Indiana State Sycamores men's basketball =

Men's basketball program

2026–27 Indiana State Sycamores men's basketball team
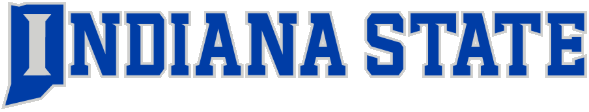
- University: Indiana State University
- First season: 1896
- Athletic director: Nathan Christensen
- Head coach: Matthew Graves (3rd season)
- Location: Terre Haute, Indiana
- Arena: Hulman Center (capacity: 9,000)
- Conference: Missouri Valley Conference
- Nickname: Sycamores
- Colors: Royal blue and white
- Student section: The Forest
- All-time record: 1,610–1,370 (.540)

NCAA Division I tournament runner-up
- 1968*, 1979
Other NCAA Division I tournament results
Final Four	1968*, 1979
Elite Eight	1968*, 1979
Sweet Sixteen	1967*, 1968*, 1979
Appearances	1966*, 1967*, 1968*, 1979, 2000, 2001, 2011

NAIA tournament champions
- 1950
Other NAIA tournament results
Runner-up	1946, 1948
Appearances	1942, 1943, 1946, 1948, 1949, 1950, 1952, 1953, 1954, 1959, 1962, 1963

Conference tournament champions
- MVC: 1979, 2001, 2011

Conference regular-season champions
- IIC: 1930, 1946, 1947, 1948, 1949, 1950; ICC: 1951, 1966, 1967, 1968; MVC: 1979, 2000, 2024

Uniforms
Home	Away
- * at Division II level

Indiana State Sycamores basketball is the NCAA Division I men's basketball program of Indiana State University in Terre Haute, Indiana. They currently compete in the Missouri Valley Conference. The team last played in the NCAA Division I men's basketball tournament in 2011.

The Sycamores' first season was 1896, making them the oldest basketball team in the NCAA along with Bucknell, Minnesota, Washington and Yale; however, the records from 1896 to 1899 have been lost over time. The Sycamores boast two College Players of the Year, 14 All-Americans, 42 1,000-point scorers, and 1,620+ victories.

In addition, the Sycamores have 28 postseason appearances (7 NCAA, 5 NIT, 2 CBI, 1 CIT, 12 NAIA, and the 1936 Olympic Trials) with six national championship appearances (2 NCAA, 1 NIT and 3 NAIA). Seven Sycamores were members of the 1951 Pan-American Games gold medal-winning team. The Sycamores' most memorable season was 1978–79, when unanimous National Player of the Year Larry Bird led an undefeated team to its first-ever NCAA Division I Tournament appearance, as well as the AP and UPI national titles. However, it lost the national title game versus the Magic Johnson-led Michigan State team; and ended the season with a record of 33–1. Their performance was the deepest run by a first-time participant in the Division I tournament, and one of only three times that a first-time team has advanced as far as the Final Four (UNCC in 1977 and Georgia in 1983). They would not have another postseason appearance until 2000.

The Sycamores were the national runner-up in the NCAA College Division (now Division II) in 1968; they won the NAIA national championship in 1950, had NAIA Finals appearances in 1946 and 1948 and NAIA National semifinals appearances in 1949 and 1953. Most recently, the Sycamores were the 2024 NIT National Finalist. Over the decades, the Sycamores were led by All-Americans Larry Bird, Duane Klueh, Dick Atha, Lenny Rzeszewski, Butch Wade and Jerry Newsom. As the program transitioned from NAIA to the NCAA, one final NAIA highlight was Ray Goddard leading the entire nation (all collegiate divisions) in free-throw percentage (91.2%) during the 1961–62 season. Former head coaches include Hall of Famer John Wooden, Purdue All-American Dave Schellhase, Glenn M. Curtis and well-known college coaches such as Bob King, Royce Waltman, Tates Locke and Ron Greene. Former assistants include collegiate head coaches such as Rick Ray (Mississippi State, Southeast Missourri), Rob Flaska (Centenary), Jim Saia (Cal State-Los Angeles), Stan Gouard (USI) and Benjy Taylor (North Central, Hawai'i and Tuskegee), Thad Matta (Butler, Xavier, Ohio State), Kareem Richardson (UMKC), Phil Hopkins (Western Carolina), Mel Garland (IUPUI), and ABA/NBA Great Mel Daniels.

The Indiana State Sycamores men's basketball team currently play their home games at the Hulman Center.

== Postseason ==
=== Division I NCAA tournament results ===
The Sycamores have appeared in four NCAA Division I Tournaments. Their combined record is 5–4.

Year	Seed	Round	Opponent	Result
1979	1	Regional Quarterfinals; Regional Semifinals; Regional Finals; Final Four; National Championship Game	(8) Virginia Tech (5) Oklahoma (2) Arkansas (2) DePaul (2) Michigan State	W 86–69; W 93–72; W 73–71; W 76–74; L 64–75
2000	12	First round	(5) Texas	L 61–77
2001	13	First round Second round	(4) Oklahoma (12) Gonzaga	W 70–68 ^{OT} L 68–85
2011	14	First round	(3) Syracuse	L 60–77

=== NIT results ===
The Sycamores have appeared in five National Invitation Tournaments (NIT). Their combined record is 5–5.

Year	Round	Opponent	Result
1977	First round	Houston	L 82–83
1978	First round Quarterfinals	Illinois State; Rutgers	W 73–71; L 56–57
2013	First round	Iowa	L 52–68
2014	First round	Arkansas	L 71–91
2024	First round Second round Quarterfinals; Semifinals; Championship Game	Southern Methodist; Minnesota; Cincinnati; Utah; Seton Hall	W 101–92; W 76–64; W 85–81; W 100–90; L 77–79

=== CBI results ===
The Sycamores have received two College Basketball Invitational (CBI) berths. Their combined record is 1–2.

Year	Round	Opponent	Result
2010	First round	Saint Louis	L 54–63
2023	First round Quarterfinals	USC Upstate; Eastern Kentucky	W 67–62; L 88–89^{OT}

=== CIT results ===
The Sycamores appeared in one CollegeInsider.com Tournament (CIT). Their record is 0–1.

Year	Round	Opponent	Result
2012	First round	Robert Morris	L 60–67

=== Division II NCAA tournament results ===
The Sycamores have appeared in three NCAA Division II basketball tournaments. Their combined record is 5–4. They hosted the Great Lakes Regional during the 1966–67 Tournament.

Year	Round	Opponent	Result
1966	Regional semifinals Regional 3rd-place game	Southern Illinois; Lamar	L 65–83; L 78–93
1967	Regional semifinals Regional Finals	Luther; Valparaiso	W 109–88; L 77–80
1968	Regional semifinals Regional Finals; National Quarterfinals; National semifinals National Championship Game	South Dakota State; Illinois State; UNLV; Trinity; Kentucky Wesleyan	W 101–83; W 98–93; W 94–75; W 77–67; L 52–63

=== NAIA Tournament results ===
The Sycamores appeared in the NAIA Division I men's basketball tournament 12 times. They reached the NAIA Final Four five times. The Sycamores combined NAIA Tournament record is 25–12. Indiana State is the only team to finish as the National Runner-Up in the NAIA and both the NCAA DI and DII tournaments.

Indiana State won 7 NAIA District 21 titles (1951, 1952, 1953, 1954, 1959, 1962 and 1963)

Year	Round	Opponent	Result
1942	First round Second round Quarterfinals	Wisconsin–Stevens Point; Simpson; Hamline	W 83–45; W 51–43; L 41–45
1943	First round	Northwest Missouri State	L 28–37
1946	First round Second round Quarterfinals; Semifinals; National Championship Game	St. Cloud State; Houston; Dakota Wesleyan; Pepperdine; Southern Illinois	W 62–51; W 62–43; W 55–34; W 56–43; L 40–49
1948	First round Second round Quarterfinals; Semifinals; National Championship Game	St. Francis (PA); BYU; San Jose State; Hamline; Louisville	W 72–40; W 82–68; W 59–52; W 66–65 ^{OT} L 70–82
1949	First round Second round Quarterfinals; Semifinals; National Third Place Game	Eastern New Mexico; Loyola (MD); Emporia State; Regis; Beloit	W 60–42; W 78–58; W 67–66; L 45–48 ^{2OT} L 59–67
1950	First round Second round Quarterfinals; Semifinals; National Championship Game	Delta State; Arkansas Tech; Baldwin–Wallace; Tampa; East Central State (OK)	W 65–59; W 87–79; W 61–39; W 73–69; W 61–57
1952	First round Second round	Farleigh Dickinson; Southwest Missouri State	W 79–72; L 64–82
1953	First round Second round Quarterfinals; Semifinals; National Third Place Game	Midwestern State; Arkansas Tech; Findlay; Southwest Missouri State; East Texas State	W 100–76; W 100–81; W 106–70; L 78–84; W 74–71
1954	First round	Geneva	L 82–88
1959	First round Second round	Morningside; Georgia Southern	W 87–67; L 70–73
1962	First round	Winston-Salem	L 71–83
1963	First round Second round	Parsons; Carson-Newman	W 78–77; L 63–70

== 1936 Olympic trials ==
Coach Wally Marks' 1935–36 Sycamores gained national attention when they participated in the first national post-season collegiate basketball tournament. The winning team would earn the right to name five players to represent the United States in the 1936 Olympic Games in Berlin, the first Games to feature the American sport of basketball. By earning the bid, the Sycamores joined a select group of college teams hand-picked by the Amateur Athletic Union, the U.S. governing organization.

The Olympic team members were selected from the best AAU teams and winners of the national collegiate tournament conducted in eight regional districts. The Sycamores earned a bid by winning two games in Indianapolis (March 12–14) and advanced to the district finals and were pitted against Coach Jim Kelly's DePaul Blue Demons, at the Chicago Armory, DePaul's home court. Despite vaulting to a 10–0 lead, maintaining a 16–10 halftime advantage and outscoring the hosts from the field, Marks' cagers lost on a long shot in the waning moments of the game, 29–28.

Year	Round	Opponent	Result
1936 United States Olympic Trials	First round Second round Third round	Miami (OH); Augustana (IL); DePaul	W 45–27; W 30–26; L 28–29

== 1951 Pan American Games ==
The 1949–50 squad won the NAIA 1950 National Championship. Subsequently, Coach John Longfellow and eight Sycamore players were invited to represent the United States in the inaugural (1951) Pan American Games, held in Buenos Aires, Argentina. Sycamores Roger Adkins, Dick Atha, Richard Babcock, Bob Gilbert, Tom Kern, Gene Lambdin, Ed Longfellow, and Cliff Murray represented the United States and Indiana State University. The United States defeated the national teams of Ecuador (74–32), Cuba (77–55), Panama (90–55) and Brazil (69–42) to reach the championship game against Argentina. The Americans defeated the hosts, (57–51), for the gold medal.

== USA Basketball players (10) ==
- Roger Adkins – 1951 Pan American Games
- Dick Atha – 1951 Pan American Games
- Richard Babcock – 1951 Pan American Games
- Bob Gilbert – 1951 Pan American Games
- Tom Kern – 1951 Pan American Games
- Gene Lambdin – 1951 Pan American Games
- Ed Longfellow – 1951 Pan American Games
- Cliff Murray – 1951 Pan American Games
- Larry Bird – 1977 World University Games
- Larry Bird – 1978 World Invitational Tournament
- Carl Nicks – 1979 Select Team.
- Larry Bird – 1992 Olympic team, a.k.a. "The Dream Team"

== Other national teams (2) ==
- DeCarsta Webster – Icelandic national basketball team (1984–1987)
- Manny Arop – Canadian University National Team (2013), Canadian Junior National Team (2011), Canadian U-19 National Team (2009), Canadian U-18 National Team (2008)

== Arenas ==
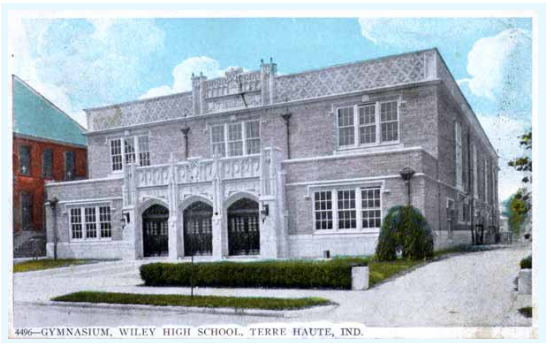

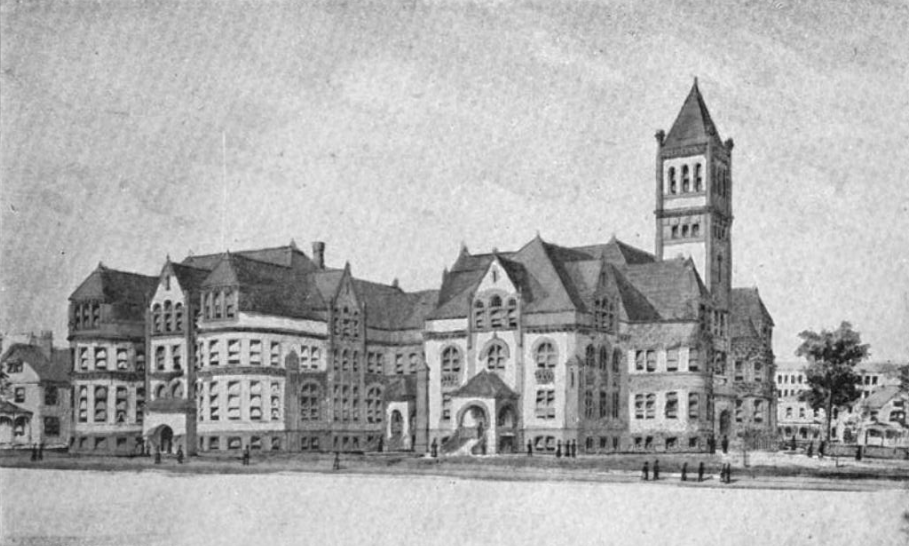
Indiana State Normal School North Hall

Year	Home	Capacity
1973–present	Hulman Center	10,200
1962–1973	Indiana State College Arena	4,800
1928–1962	Indiana State Teacher's College Gymnasium	3,000
1923–1928	Terre Haute William H. Wiley High School Gymnasium	1,600
1895–1923	Indiana State Normal School North Hall	unk

== Player of the year ==
=== National awards ===
==== National Player of the Year (2) ====
- Duane Klueh – 1948 NAIB Player of the Year Helms Foundation
- Larry Bird – 1979 consensus

==== Oscar Robertson Trophy (1) ====
- Larry Bird – 1979

==== Naismith Award (1) ====
- Larry Bird – 1979

==== John R. Wooden Award (1) ====
- Larry Bird – 1979

==== Associated Press College Basketball Player of the Year (1) ====
- Larry Bird – 1979

==== Adolph Rupp Trophy (1) ====
- Larry Bird – 1979

==== Eastman Award (1) ====
- Larry Bird – 1979

==== Joe Lapchick Award (1) ====
- Larry Bird – 1979

==== The Sporting News (1) ====
- Larry Bird – 1979

==== Basketball Times (1) ====
- Larry Bird – 1979

==== Basketball Weekly (1) ====
- Larry Bird – 1979

=== Conference (6) ===
- Roger Adkins – 1952 Indiana Collegiate Conference
- Butch Wade – 1967 Indiana Collegiate Conference
- Jerry Newsom – 1968 Indiana Collegiate Conference
- Larry Bird – 1978 Larry Bird Trophy
- Larry Bird – 1979 Larry Bird Trophy
- Nate Green – 2000 Larry Bird Trophy

=== National tournament (3) ===
- Duane Klueh – 1948 NAIA Chuck Taylor Most Valuable Player
- Lenny Rzeszewski – 1950 NAIA Chuck Taylor Most Valuable Player
- Jerry Newsom – 1968 NCAA Div II Men's Championship Most Outstanding Player

== Retired numbers ==
Five Sycamore players have had their numbers retired by the school. Jerry Newsom is the latest, with his number 41 retired by the school on February 19, 2022.

Indiana State Sycamores retired numbers
No.	Player	Pos.	Tenure	No. ret.	Ref.
22	Carl Nicks	F	1976–77, 1978–80	2019	
33	Larry Bird	F	1976–79	2004	
41	Jerry Newsom	F / C	1964–68	2022	
44	John Sherman Williams	F	1982–86	2024	
54	Duane Klueh	F	1945–49	2004	

== All-Century Team ==
In 1899, basketball became a Sycamore tradition; in the first official game, State defeated the Terre Haute YMCA by a score of 20–17; in 1999, to recognize the first century of intercollegiate basketball, a panel selected the following All-Century Team.

In addition, 'All-Decade' teams were selected for the following:

- 1910s–1920s, 1930s, 1940s, 1950s, 1960s, 1970s, 1980s, 1990s

The rosters and more information can be found in the Winter 1999 (Volume 3, Number 1) issue of the 'Indiana State University Alumni Magazine.

Indiana State's All-Century Team
Name	Career	Notes
Roy 'Goose' Burris	1922–25	Member of Akron Firestone Non-Skids (1928–1934), 1933 NBL Champion; MiLB career (1925–1928)
Les Reynolds	1929–31	All-American Guard
Duane Klueh	1947–49	#7 career scorer; NAIB Player of the Year; All-American Forward, NBA Guard
Lenny Rzeszewski	1947–50	All-American Forward; NAIB Player of the Year
Dick Atha	1950–53	#24 career scorer, All-American Guard, NBA guard
Jerry Newsom	1966–68	#3 scorer, #2 rebounds, 2-time All-American Forward, NBA draftee
Butch Wade	1965–67	#4 scorer, 2-time All-American Guard, NBA draftee
George Pillow	1969–71	All-CMU Forward, #6 career rbs, #14 career pts
Larry Bird	1977–79	3-time All-American Forward; Consensus National Player of the Year, Basketball Hall of Fame NBA Forward
Carl Nicks	1977, 1979–80	Guard, #7-T career pts, #8 career steals, NBA Guard
John Sherman Williams	1983–86	Forward, # 2 career pts, 4-time All-MVC, CBA & Foreign Leagues
Jim Cruse	1994–96	Forward, #5 career rbs, 2-time All-MVC
Coach Duane Klueh	1955–67	#1 wins, 3x ICC titles, 4-time ICC Coach of the Year, 5x post-season appearances.
Total members		13

== All-Americans (17) ==
- Les Reynolds – 1930 Helms Foundation
- Duane Klueh – 1948 Helms Foundation
- Lenny Rzeszewski – 1949 NAIB
- Bob Royer – 1946, 1948, 1949 NAIB
- Dick Atha – 1953 Helms Foundation
- Butch Wade – 1965 AP, UPI
- Jerry Newsom – 1966 UPI
- Butch Wade – 1966 UPI
- Jerry Newsom – 1968 Coaches, AP, UPI
- Rick Williams – 1975 Basketball Weekly-Honorable Mention, Sporting News, Converse
- Rick Williams – 1976 Basketball Weekly-Honorable Mention, Sporting News, Converse
- Larry Bird – 1977 UPI-Third Team, AP-Honorable Mention
- Larry Bird – 1978 AP, UPI, USBWA, The Sporting News, Basketball Weekly
- Larry Bird – 1979 AP, UPI, USBWA, The Sporting News, Basketball Weekly
- Carl Nicks – 1980 AP Honorable Mention
- Robbie Avila – 2024 Lou Henson Mid-Major
- Isaiah Swope – 2024 Lou Henson Mid-Major

=== CoSIDA Academic All-Americans (4) ===
- Dan Bush (Second Team) 1972
- Mike Route (Third Team) 1976
- Greg Thomas (Second Team) 1993
- Matt Renn (Second Team) 2001

=== NCAA Post-Graduate scholarship (2) ===
- Dan Bush 1972
- Steve Reed 1981

== All-Conference (35) ==
Only players selected for the conference first team are displayed; for second team and honorable mention, please consult the Indiana State Men's basketball media guide at www.gosycamores.com

=== All-Indiana Intercollegiate Conference (2) ===
Year	Player
1943	Bill Hitch
1946	Ed Lash

=== All-Indiana Collegiate Conference (18) ===
Year	Player
1951	Dick Atha
1951	Cliff Murray
1952	Rodger Adkins (MVP)
1952	Sam Richardson
1952	Dick Atha
1953	Roger Adkins
1954	Joe Lee
1956	Sam Richardson
1958	Jim Bates
1961	Howard Dardeen
1962	Howard Dardeen
1964	Wayne Allison
1965	Butch Wade
1966	Jerry Newsom
1966	Butch Wade
1967	Jerry Newsom
1967	Butch Wade (MVP)
1968	Jerry Newsom (MVP)

=== All-Midwestern Conference (3) ===
Year	Player
1971	George Pillow
1971	Bob Barker
1972	Dan Bush

=== All-Missouri Valley Conference (13) ===
Year	Player
1978	Larry Bird (MVP)
1979	Larry Bird (MVP)
1979	Carl Nicks
1980	Carl Nicks
1985	John Sherman Williams
1986	John Sherman Williams
1998	Jayson Wells
2000	Nate Green (MVP)
2001	Matt Renn
2013	Jake Odum
2014	Jake Odum
2020	Tyreke Key
2021	Tyreke Key
2024	Robbie Avila

== Career leaders ==
=== Scoring ===
Name	Points
Larry Bird	2,850
John Sherman Williams	2,374
Jerry Newsom	2,147
Brenton Scott	1,760
Butch Wade	1,672
Tyreke Key	1,650
Jake Odum	1,568
David Moss	1,562
Jordan Barnes	1,558
Eddie Bird	1,555
Duane Klueh	1,432
Carl Nicks	1,432
Rick Williams	1,351
Matt Renn	1,347
Cooper Neese	1,332

=== Three-pointers ===
Name	Points
Michael Menser	283
Jordan Barnes	271
Brenton Scott	270
Jordan Printy	215
Cooper Neese	203
Eddie Bird	161
Travis Inman	154
Tyreke Key	153
Chad Adkins	149
Aaron Carter	133
Greg Thomas	130
Marcus Howard	125
Marico Stinson	125
Gabe Moore	120
Rashad Reed	118

=== Rebounds ===
Name	Rebounds
Larry Bird	1,247
Jerry Newsom	953
DeCarsta Webster	862
Matt Renn	789
Jim Cruse	771
George Pillow	731
Carl Richard	709
Djibril Kante	676
Rick Williams	661
John Sherman Williams	629
Brad Miley	627
Bob Barker	620
Jay Tunnell	610
Rich Mason	581
David Moss	570

=== Assists ===
Name	Assists
Steve Reed	616
Jake Odum	602
Rick Fields	551
Jimmy Smith	517
Nate Green	496
Gabe Moore	444
Larry Bird	435
Michael Menser	426
Jordan Barnes	383
Nick Hargrove	369
Julian Larry	357
David Moss	350
Greg Thomas	331
Steve Phillips	328
Devonte Brown	284

=== Steals ===
Name	Steals
Larry Bird	240
Nate Green	240
Gabe Moore	203
Jake Odum	202
Michael Menser	188
Brenton Scott	173
Matt Renn	165
Julian Larry	158
Rick Fields	149
Jordan Barnes	138
David Moss	133
Carl Nicks	128
Marcus Howard	125
Nick Hargrove	118
Devonte Brown	113

=== Blocked shots ===
Name	Blocks
DeCarsta Webster	168
Isiah Martin	136
Djibril Kante	127
Emondre Rickman	116
Nate Green	109
Justin Gant	96
Jayson Wells	94
Larry Bird	83
Alex Gilbert	75
John Sherman Williams	72
Jake Kitchell	70
Marcus Johnson	66
Myles Walker	61
Josh Crawford	61
Terry Braun	53

- A bronze statue of Larry Bird by sculptor Bill Wolfe was dedicated on November 9, 2013, prior to the annual men's basketball with Ball State University. The statue honors Bird's legendary status in the Holy Land of Basketball _ INDIANA.

== Coaching leaders ==
The Sycamores have been led by 26 different Head Coaches through their history, the top 16 coaches; in terms of wins; are listed below.

Years	Coach (Alma Mater)	Wins	Losses	Pct.
1955–1967	Duane Klueh (**Indiana State**)	**182**	122	.599
2010–2021	Greg Lansing (South Dakota)	181	164	.525
1997–2007	Royce Waltman (Slippery Rock)	134	164	.450
1938–1946	Glenn M. Curtis (**Indiana State**)	122	45	.731
1948–1954	John Longfellow (Manchester)	122	64	.656
1967–1974	Gordon B. Stauffer (Michigan State)	121	92	.568
1927–1931, 1933–1938	Wally Marks (Chicago)	91	59	.607
1978–1982	Bill Hodges (Purdue / Marian, (Ind.)	67	48	.582
2021–2024	Josh Schertz (Fla. Atlantic)	66	40	.623
1975–1978	Bob King (Iowa)	61	24	.718
1918–1923	Birch Bayh (**Indiana State**)	57	24	.704
1989–1994	Tates Locke (Ohio Wesleyan)	50	88	.411
1912–1917	Alfred F. Westphal (Amherst)	47	23	.671
1946–1948	John Wooden (Purdue)	44	15	**.746**
2007–2010	Kevin McKenna (Creighton)	43	52	.453
1982–1985	Dave Schellhase (Purdue)	37	48	.435
2024–	**Matthew Graves** (Butler)	**25**	**39**	**.391**
31 seasons	16 other coaches	171	280	.380
**1896–Present**	**PROGRAM TOTALs**	**1,623**	**1,391**	**.538**

Leaders in BOLD

- A bronze statue of Coach John Wooden by sculptor Blair Buswell was dedicated when the newly renovated Pauley Pavilion opened on October 26, 2012, a men's basketball was played at the UCLA arena between Indiana State and UCLA on November 9, 2012. The game honored Wooden's coaching career at both schools.

== Coach of the Year ==
=== National (2) ===
- Bill Hodges – 1979 AP, UPI, The Sporting News.
- Josh Schertz – 2024 Hugh Durham Award

=== Conference (9) ===
- Josh Schertz – 2024 Missouri Valley Conference: League Media & Coaches
- Kevin McKenna – 2010 Missouri Valley Conference: CollegeInsider.com
- Royce Waltman – 2000 Missouri Valley Conference: League Media & Coaches
- Tates Locke – 1991 Missouri Valley Conference: League Media & Coaches
- Bill Hodges – 1979 Missouri Valley Conference: League Media & Coaches
- Duane Klueh – 1959, 1963, 1966, 1967 Indiana Collegiate Conference: League Media & Coaches

== Sycamores in the professional leagues ==
=== Draft history ===
- 19 Indiana State players have been drafted by the BAA, NBA, ABL, ABA and NDBL and NBA G League. Jerry Newsom was drafted by the Indiana Pacers of the original ABA in the 1968 ABA draft. Ray Goddard was drafted by the Kansas City Steers in the 1962 ABL draft

BAA | NBA Regular Draft

Year	Round	Pick	Overall	Player	Team
2026	2	7	37	Ryan Conwell	Oklahoma City Thunder
2022	1	19	19	Jake LaRavia	Minnesota Timberwolves
1983	3	5	52	Winfred King	Boston Celtics
1980	1	23	23	Carl Nicks	Denver Nuggets
1980	6	17	132	Alex Gilbert	Milwaukee Bucks
1978	1	6	6	Larry Bird	Boston Celtics
1978	6	9	129	Harry Morgan	San Antonio Spurs
1968	6	10	74	Jerry Newsom	Boston Celtics
1968	19	2	209	Rich Mason	Chicago Bulls
1967	7	5	72	Butch Wade	New York Knicks
1953	6	–	50	Dick Atha	New York Knicks
1950	4	4	40	Len Rzeszewski	Fort Wayne Pistons
1949	7	1	54	Duane Klueh	Boston Celtics
1949	8	4	61	Bob Royer	Providence Steam Rollers

NBDL | NBA G League Draft

Year	Round	Pick	Overall	Player	Team
2013	7	13	113	Dwayne Lathan	Rio Grande Valley Vipers
2011	2	2	18	Jake Kelly	Texas Legends
2011	7	15	110	Harry Marshall	Canton Charge

ABA Draft

Year	Round	Pick	Overall	Player	Team
1968	6th – 10th	unk	55th or lower	Jerry Newsom	Indiana Pacers

ABL Draft

Year	Round	Pick	Overall	Player	Team
1962	11th	unk	unk	Ray Goddard	Kansas City Steers

=== Sycamores in the NBA ===
Fifteen former Sycamores have played in the NBA and its predecessors, the (NBL, the BAA), and the ABA. They are:

- Dick Atha: 1955–56 – New York Knicks; 1957–1958 – Detroit Pistons
- Ken Bannister: 1984–1986 – New York Knicks; 1987–1989 – Los Angeles Clippers
- Larry Bird: 1979–1992 – Boston Celtics
- George Chestnut: 1933–1937 – Indianapolis Kautskys
- Doyle Cofer: 1948–49 – Detroit Vagabond Kings
- Rick Darnell: 1975–1976 – Virginia Squires
- John Hazen: 1948–1949 – Boston Celtics
- Harold Johnson: 1946–1947 – Detroit Falcons
- Duane Klueh: 1949–1950 – Denver Nuggets; 1950–1951 – Fort Wayne Pistons
- Jake LaRavia: 2022–present – Memphis Grizzlies; Sacramento Kings; Los Angeles Lakers
- John Miklozek: 1936–1937 – Indianapolis Kautskys
- Carl Nicks: 1980–1982 – Denver Nuggets, Utah Jazz; 1982–1983 – Cleveland Cavaliers
- George Pearcy: 1946–1947 – Detroit Falcons
- Henry Pearcy: 1946–1947 – Detroit Falcons
- Bob Royer: 1949–1950 – Denver Nuggets

==== NBA, ABA, BAA, NBL, Champions ====
- Roy "Goose" Burris (1933) Akron Firestone Non-Skids
- Larry Bird: (1981, 1984, 1986) Boston Celtics

=== Sycamores in other professional leagues ===
45+ Indiana State players have played in foreign leagues; DeCarsta Webster and Brad Miley both won titles in Iceland, David Moss, Jayson Wells, and Djibril Kante have each won multiple championships in European and South American leagues

- Jerod Adler – BBC Nyon – Basket-club Boncourt – Switzerland League A
- Manny Arop – Norrköping Dolphins – Sweden – Basketligan; Webmoebel Baskets – Germany – ProA; Niagara River Lions – National Basketball League of Canada
- Keenan Barlow – Dublin – Ireland – Premier League (Ireland)
- Jordan Barnes – Paderborn Baskets – Germany ProA (2021–2022); Giessen 46ers – Germany Bundesliga (2022–2023); Coosur Real Betis – Spain Liga ACB (2023–24); Petkim Spor – T-TBL (2024–2025)
- Xavier Bledson – Tampereen Pyrintö – Korisliiga (Finland Top League); BK Iskra Svit – Extraliga (2024–25)
- Kelyn Block – Lausanne MB – Switzerland League A; Nanterre 92, UJAP Quimper 29 – France; Premijer liga BiH
- Devonte Brown – Paderborn Baskets – Germany ProA (2017–18); OKK Sloboda Tuzla – Bosnia-Herzegovina Premijer liga BiH (2016–17)
- Aaron Carter – Grand Rapids Danger ABA
- Joshua Crawford – Ehime (2016–17), Kumamoto Volters (2015–16) Japan – B.League; MBK Baník Handlová (2014–15) Extraliga; BC Nevėžis LKL (2014–15); BC Beroe (2013–14), BC Balkan (2011–12) NBL
- Jim Cruse – Diadolle Asptt Dijon – France N3
- Amani Daanish – Segamat (2009), Mississauga Power – Canada (2012–13), Island Storm – Canada (2013–14), Saint John Riptide – Canada (2013–14) Salon Vilpas Vikings – Finland – 1st Division
- Trenton Gibson – Feyenoord Basketball – Belgium – (2023–24), Kangoeroes Basket Mechelen – Belgium – (2024–25)
- Alex Gilbert – Played in the Úrvalsdeild karla and the Icelandic Division I in Iceland with Njarðvík (Iceland) and Grindavík
- Nate Green – Pallalcesto Amatori Udine (2007–08), Olimpia Milano (2006–07), Fortitudo Pallacanestro Bologna (2005–06), S.S. Felice Scandone (2003–05) – Italy Lega Basket Serie A; Columbus Riverdragons (2002–03), North Charleston Lowgators (2001–02) – USA – NBDL; Canberra Cannons Australia – National Basketball League (Australia) (2000–01)
- Lamar Grimes – Marinos de Bolivar BPC, BK Iskra Svit Extraliga; Al Jaysh Army SC – Qatar – D1
- Steve Hart – Fayetteville Patriots – (2001–02) – USA – NBDL
- Cam Henry – Skyliners Frankfurt – ProA Germany – (2023–24), VfL Kirchheim Knights – ProA Germany – (2024–25)
- Djibril Kante – Malvin Montevideo – Uruguay – LUB; Atenas Córdoba – Argentina – LigaA
- Jake Kelly – Texas Legends (2011–12) PAOK – Greece – Greek Basket League;
- Jayson Kent – Rip City Remix (2025–2026)
- Tyreke Key – Leuven Bears – Belgium – (2023–24), Raptors 905 – G League (2024–2025)
- Jake Kitchell – Slavia TU Košice – Slovakia – SBL
- Winfred King – Nuova Pallacanestro Gorizia (Italy), CB Breogán, CB Collado Villalba (Spain), APU Udine, Pallacanestro Firenze (Italy), Maccabi Tel Aviv B.C. (Israel)
- Julian Larry – Uni Baskets Münster, ProA (Germany)
- Dwayne Lathan – BC Sokhumi Superliga (2017) Rio Grande Valley Vipers – USA NBDL (2013–present); Osaka Evessa – Japan – bj league (2012–13)
- Cade McKnight – Iraurgi SB – Spanish LEB – Spain – (2023–24)
- Brad Miley – With Valur (1980–1981) and Keflavík (1982–1983) in Iceland and with Geelong Supercats in Australia 1982
- Courvoisier-McCauley – Résidence Walferdange (2023–24)
- Todd McCoy – Delaware Destroyers- USA EBA and NPBL
- Gabriel Moore – ETB Wohnbau Baskets Essen, Soba Dragons Rhoendorf – Germany – ProB
- Steve McWhorter – Den Bosch Basketball DBL
- David Moss – Basket Brescia Leonessa (2015-pres), EA7 Emporio Armani Milano (2013–2015), Montepaschi Siena – Italy – SerieA (2010–2013)
- Jake Odum – Banvit B.K. Turkey (2017–18); s.Oliver Würzburg (2016–2017); Medi Bayreuth (2015–2016); PAOK – Greece – GBL (2014–2015)
- Larry Sample – New York Nationals – (1972–76) – opponent/foil to Harlem Globetrotters
- Khristian Smith – SLUNETA Ústí nad Labem, NBL
- Paul Stroud – Washington Generals/New York Nationals – (1972–75) – opponent/foil to Harlem Globetrotters
- Matt Renn – Valence Condom Castera RGB – France – N2
- Emondre Rickman – Surrey Scorchers – United Kingdom (2020–21); S.C._Lusitânia – Portugal (2019–20); Ovarense Basquetebol P-LPB (2024–2025)
- Kailex Stephens – Feniks 2010 – Macedonian Super League – Macedonia (2023–24)
- Devin Thomas – BMS Herlev Wolfpack – Denmark (2020–21)
- Myles Walker – Oliveirense – Portugal LPB
- DeCarsta Webster – 20-year career in Iceland in the Úrvalsdeild karla and the Icelandic Division I (1979–1999)
- Jayson Wells – 13-yr career in foreign leagues; some teams include: Poltava-Basket Poltava – Ukraine – Superleague; Maccabi Rishon – Israel Premier League
- Christian Williams – Telstar Hesperange of the Total League
- Rick Williams – [(Croix Rousse Olympique Division 1)] (1976–77)
- Trent Williams – United Basketball – BNXT League (2024–2025)
- Max Woolsey Boston Whirlwinds (1950–52) – United States – opponent/foil to Harlem Globetrotters
- Trent Wurtz – Musel Pikes – Luxembourg – Total League, Christchurch Cougars – New Zealand – NBL,

== Basketball Hall(s) of Fame ==
Hall of Fame Sycamores

Thirty-two former Sycamores players and coaches have been inducted into various Halls of Fame; they are:

=== Basketball Hall of Fame (3) ===
- John Wooden Player, 1961; Coach, 1973—The first person to be inducted as Coach & Player.
- Larry Bird Player, 1998
- Mel Daniels Player, 2012 (Assistant Coach at Indiana State, 1976–1980)

=== National Collegiate Basketball Hall of Fame (2) ===
- John Wooden – 2006 (The Inaugural Class)
- Larry Bird – 2009

=== NAIA Hall of Fame (4) ===
- Duane Klueh – 1955
- Clemens 'Lenny' Rzewszewski – 1956
- John Longfellow – 1960
- John Wooden – 2009

=== National Small College Basketball Hall of Fame (2) ===
- Clarence Walker – 2018
- John Wooden – 2018

=== Missouri Valley Conference Hall of Fame (4) ===
- Larry Bird – 1997
- Duane Klueh – 2006
- John Wooden – 2009
- Bob King – 2014

In addition to the Conference Hall of Fame; the MVC selected an All-Centennial Team in honor of the Conference's 100th Anniversary; the Sycamores had three players named to that team; Larry Bird, Carl Nicks and John Sherman Williams.

=== Indiana Basketball Hall of Fame (40) ===
- John R. Wooden – 1962
- Glenn M. Curtis – 1964
- David Glascock – 1966
- John Longfellow – 1967
- Howard Sharpe – 1971
- Johnnie Baratto – 1972
- Lester "Les" Reynolds – 1972
- Jesse Wood – 1973
- Charles Fouty – 1980
- Ward Brown – 1981
- Dick Atha – 1988

- Duane Klueh – 1988
- Arley Andrews – 1989
- Stanley Shimala – 1990
- Jim Powers – 1993
- Tom Pitts – 1995
- Jerry Newsom – 1997
- David Nicholson – 1999
- Larry Bird – 2000
- Danny Bush – 2000
- Jerry Baker – 2000
- Clemens "Lenny" Rzeszewski – 2001

- George Pillow – 2002
- Keith Doughety – 2004
- Gordon B. Stauffer – 2004
- G. Michael Jones – 2005
- Steve Hollenbeck – 2006
- Pete Pritchett – 2007
- Dr. Michael C. Copper – 2010
- John Robbins – 2011
- J.R. Holmes – 2012
- Brad Miley – 2016
- Butch Wade – 2016

- Al Tucker – 2017
- Steve Brett – 2018
- Dan Dimich – 2019
- John Grimes – 2019
- Jerry Hoover – 2019
- Clarence Walker – 2022
- John Sherman Williams – 2022

=== Indiana State University Hall of Fame (42) ===
Individuals

- David Glascock – 1982
- Duane Klueh – 1982
- Wally Marks – 1982
- Clemens "Lenny" Rzeszewski – 1982
- Paul Selge – 1982
- Paul Wolf – 1982
- Dick Atha – 1984
- John L. Longfellow – 1984
- Jerry Newsom – 1984
- Dr. Raymond Sparks – 1984
- Butch Wade – 1984

- Fred Wampler – 1984
- John Wooden – 1984
- John Baratto – 1986
- Jim Carr – 1986
- Sam Richardson – 1986
- Dr. John Miklozek – 1986
- Glenn M. Curtis – 1998
- Howard Sharpe, – 1998
- Birch E. Bayh Sr. – 1998
- Larry Bird – 1999
- Bob King – 1999

- George Pillow – 2003
- Ward Brown – 2004
- Ray Goddard – 2005
- Paul "Billy" Williams – 2005
- Roy "Goose" Burris – 2006
- Carl Nicks – 2007
- George Chestnut – 2008
- John Sherman Williams – 2008
- Bob Barker – 2010
- Nate Green – 2012
- Michael Menser – 2012

- Matt Renn – 2012
- Rick Williams – 2016
- Jim Cruse – 2017
- Bill Hodges – 2019
- Steve Newton – 2019
- Jim Waugh – 2020
- Dan Dimich – 2021
- Don McDonald – 2021
- Wally Webb – 2021

Teams

- 1978–79 Men's Basketball Team (Inducted 1999)
  Larry Bird, Tom Crowder, Eric Curry, Alex Gilbert, Bob Heaton, Brad Miley, Carl Nicks, Rod McNelly, Rich Nemcek, Steve Reed, Bob Ritter, Leroy Staley, Scott Turner. Trainers: Bob Behnke, Rick Shaw. Head Coach: Bill Hodges. Assistant Coaches: Mel Daniels, Terry Thimlar. Graduate Assistant Coach: Danny King.
- 1949–50 Men's Basketball Team (Inducted 2000)
  Jim Berger, Richard Campbell, Dan Dimich, Bob Gilbert, Jim Hans, Buren Hooper, Max Hungerford, Bill Jagodzinski, Jerry Kunkel, Gene Lambdin, Ed Longfellow, Don McDonald, Dick Pattengale, Jim Powers, Jack Reece, Len Rzeszewski, John Scott, Clarence Walker. Managers: Stan Jacobs, John Sweet. Head Coach: John Longfellow. Assistant Coach: Max Andress.
- 1967–68 Men's Basketball Team (Inducted 2005)
  Daniel Chitwood, Michael Cooper, Ken Haas, Fred Hardman, Rodney Hervey, Steven Hollenbeck, Howard Humes, John McIntire, Richard Mason, Jerry Newsom, Gerald Novak, Mike Phillips, James Waldrip, Don Weirlich, Thomas Zellers. Head Coach: Gordon Stauffer. Assistant Coach: Melvin Garland.

=== Iowa High School Athletic Association Basketball Hall of Fame ===
- Greg Lansing

== In popular culture ==
During the Quantum Leap episode, The Leap Home: Part 1 – November 25, 1969 (1990); the father of lead character Dr. Samuel Beckett (Scott Bakula) remarks that while "Sam will likely end up at Harvard, I know he's still hoping for a basketball scholarship from Indiana State."
