= Robbie Avila =

American basketball player (born 2003)

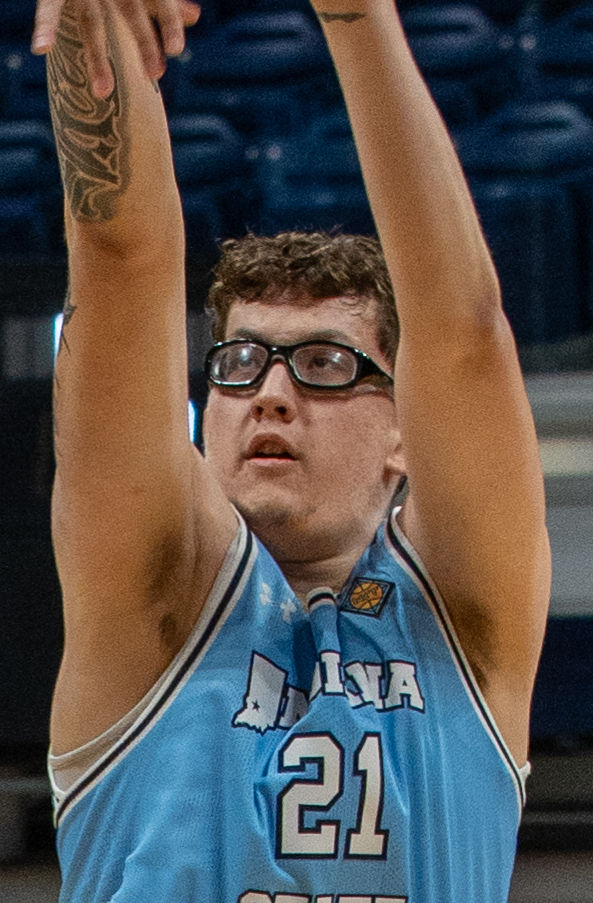
- Avila with Indiana State in 2024

No. 21 – TCU Horned Frogs
- Position: Center
- Conference: Big 12 Conference

Personal information
- Born: September 10, 2003 (age 23) Oak Forest, Illinois, U.S.
- Listed height: 6 ft 10 in (2.08 m)
- Listed weight: 240 lb (109 kg)

Career information
- High school: Oak Forest (Oak Forest, Illinois)
- College: Indiana State (2022–2024); Saint Louis (2024–2026); TCU (2026–present)

Career highlights
- Atlantic 10 Player of the Year (2026); First-team All-Atlantic 10 (2026); Second-team All-Atlantic 10 (2025); First-team All-MVC (2024); MVC All-Freshman team (2023)

Roberto Avila (/ˈɑːvɪlə/ AH-vil-ə) (born September 10, 2003) is an American college basketball player for the TCU Horned Frogs of the Big 12 Conference. He previously played for the Indiana State Sycamores and Saint Louis Billikens. Avila was the Atlantic 10 Player of the Year in 2026.

== High school career ==
Avila attended Oak Forest High School in Oak Forest, Illinois. As a junior, Avila averaged 25.5 points and 11.5 rebounds. In his final season as a senior, he averaged 23.9 points, 10.6 rebounds, 3.1 assists, 2.1 steals, and two blocks, leading Oak Forest to a 25–8 record and becoming the school's all-time leading scorer.

=== Recruiting ===
Avila was ranked as the sixth-best player in the state of Illinois and the 54th-best power forward in the country according to 247Sports. He committed to play college basketball at Indiana State University over offers from Appalachian State, Bradley, Loyola Chicago, Richmond, and Southern Illinois.

== College career ==
=== Indiana State ===
As a freshman for the Indiana State Sycamores, Avila averaged 10.7 points and 4.0 rebounds, and was selected to the Missouri Valley Conference All-Freshman team. He began the next season averaging 16.5 points, 4.2 assists, and 6.6 rebounds through the first ten games of the season, including a 27-point, eight rebound, and eight assist performance against Rice in a 103–88 victory. On January 24, 2024, he was named the conference player of the week after averaging 22 points, 8.5 rebounds and 4.5 assists across a span of two games. Avila scored a career-high 35 points in an 85–67 win over Evansville on February 28, 2024. He finished his sophomore season averaging 17.4 points, 6.6 rebounds, and 4.1 assists per game, helping lead Indiana State to a 32–7 record and an appearance in the National Invitation Tournament (NIT) final. On April 9, 2024, he entered the NCAA transfer portal.

=== Saint Louis ===
On April 20, 2024, Avila transferred to play for the Saint Louis Billikens, following Indiana State head coach Josh Schertz. On November 4, Avila injured his ankle in his debut, and missed three weeks.

In the 2025-2026 season, Avila led Saint Louis to a 27-4 regular season record and a share of the Atlantic 10 Regular Season title and he was named A-10 Men’s Basketball Player of the Year.

In October 2026, Avila was set to return to Saint Louis after filing a lawsuit against the NCAA and being granted a fifth season of eligibility. However, the College Sports Commission denied Saint Louis's request to add Avila as a 16th player, citing a strict 15-man roster limit. They informed him he may be able to play elsewhere, just not on a team at capacity.

=== TCU ===
On November 12, 2026, Avila joined the TCU Horned Frogs. He made his TCU debut on November 19, 2026 and scored his 2,000th career point in the game.

== Professional career ==
After going unselected in the 2026 NBA draft, Avila signed an Exhibit 10 contract with the Los Angeles Lakers on June 25, 2026.

== Personal life ==
Due to similarities in the playstyles of Denver Nuggets center Nikola Jokić, Avila has been nicknamed the "College Jokić". Furthermore, Kentucky Wildcats talk radio host Matt Jones gave Avila the nickname "Cream Abdul-Jabbar". Avila's other nicknames include "Larry Nerd", "Larry Blurred", "Steph Blurry", "Milk Chamberlain", "Kevin Duranch", "Shaquille Oatmeal", "Kevin McPale", "Rob Wave", "Nikola Yogurt", and "Charles Barley". These nicknames were bestowed to Avila by fans, teammates, and users on Twitter, due to Avila being white and wearing protective goggles. Avila is of Mexican descent through his father.

== Career statistics ==
Legend
GP	Games played	GS	Games started	MPG	Minutes per game
FG%	Field goal percentage	3P%	3-point field goal percentage	FT%	Free throw percentage
RPG	Rebounds per game	APG	Assists per game	SPG	Steals per game
BPG	Blocks per game	PPG	Points per game	**Bold**	Career high

=== College ===
Year	Team	GP	GS	MPG	FG%	3P%	FT%	RPG	APG	SPG	BPG	PPG
2022–23	Indiana State	34	29	21.3	.540	.337	.705	4.0	1.6	.7	.4	10.7
2023–24	Indiana State	**37**	**37**	31.2	**.536**	.394	**.808**	6.6	**4.1**	.7	.6	**17.4**
2024–25	Saint Louis	31	31	**34.0**	.492	.359	.750	**6.9**	4.0	**1.2**	**.8**	17.3
2025–26	Saint Louis	35	35	26.4	.497	**.410**	.803	4.5	**4.1**	.6	.5	12.8
Career		137	132	28.2	.516	.379	.773	5.5	3.5	.8	.6	14.5
