= Nate Green =

American basketball player and official

Personal information
- Born: December 2, 1977 (age 48) Des Moines, Iowa, U.S.
- Listed height: 6 ft 5 in (1.96 m)
- Listed weight: 195 lb (88 kg)

Career information
- High school: Theodore Roosevelt (Des Moines, Iowa)
- College: Indiana State (1996–2000)
- NBA draft: 2000: undrafted
- Playing career: 2000–2008
- Position: Shooting guard

Career history
- 2000–2001: Canberra Cannons
- 2001–2002: North Charleston Lowgators
- 2002–2003: Columbus Riverdragons
- 2003–2005: Air Avellino
- 2005–2006: Climamio Bologna
- 2006–2007: Armani Jeans Milano
- 2007–2008: Snaidero Cucine Udine

Career highlights
- MVC Player of the Year (2000); First-team All-MVC (2000)

Nathan Anthony Green (born December 2, 1977) is a current NBA referee and retired American basketball player who played professionally in the Australian National Basketball League, the NBA Development League and Italy's Lega Serie A.

Green, a 6'5" shooting guard from Theodore Roosevelt High School in Des Moines, Iowa, played collegiately at Indiana State University in Terre Haute, Indiana from 1996 to 2000. While there, Green was a four-year starter and as a senior in the 1999–2000 season led the Sycamores to the first NCAA tournament appearance in 21 years. That year, Green averaged 16.8 points, 5.4 rebounds and 4.4 assists and was named the Missouri Valley Conference Player of the Year and defensive player of the year. For his career, Green scored 1,182 points and is the school all-time co-leader in steals with 240 - a record he shares with Larry Bird.

Following the close of his college career, Green played in Australia's National Basketball League for the Canberra Cannons. He then returned to the United States to play two seasons in the NBA Development League for the North Charleston Lowgators and the Columbus Riverdragons. He then played several seasons in Italy's top league, averaging 20.5 points per game over seven seasons.

Green retired as a professional basketball player and now works as an NBA official. He was inducted into the Indiana State Athletic Hall of Fame in 2012.
