= Missouri Valley Conference Hall of Fame =

Coordinates: 38°37′36″N 90°12′9″W

The Missouri Valley Conference Hall of Fame was established in 1997 in celebration of the league's 90th anniversary. It was established to honor on an annual basis the great players, coaches and administrators in Missouri Valley Conference history. The MVC Hall of Fame is housed in the Scottrade Center in St. Louis.

== Selection criteria ==
- The individual must have competed as a Missouri Valley Conference student-athlete, coached and/or served in an administrative capacity during the time his/her institution was or currently is a member of the Missouri Valley Conference.
- Individuals must have completed their athletic eligibility, left the coaching ranks or been out of the Conference for at least five years.
- Individuals do not have to be Missouri Valley Conference graduates; they need only have attended or worked at an MVC institution.

== Members ==
- 1997
  - Larry Bird, Indiana State
  - Hersey Hawkins, Bradley
  - Henry Iba, Oklahoma A&M
  - Ed Macauley, Saint Louis
  - Oscar Robertson, Cincinnati
  - Dave Stallworth, Wichita State
  - Wes Unseld, Louisville
  - Paul Morrison, (Note: Paul Morrison Award) Drake
- 1998
  - Bob Kurland, Oklahoma A&M
  - Chet Walker, Bradley
  - Xavier McDaniel, Wichita State
  - Kenneth Shaw, (Note: Lifetime Achievement) Illinois State
  - Doug Collins, (Note: Institutional Great) Illinois State
  - Dr. Lee C. Bevilacqua, Creighton
- 1999
  - Antoine Carr, Wichita State
  - Joe Carter, Wichita State
  - Melody Howard, Missouri State
  - Holli Hyche, Indiana State
  - Glen McCullough, Bradley
- 2000
  - Cleo Littleton, Wichita State
  - Dick Boushka, Saint Louis
  - Maury John, Drake
  - Walt Frazier, Southern Illinois
  - John Q. Hammons, Missouri State
- 2001
  - Larry Finch, Memphis
  - Ralph Miller, Wichita State
  - Wanda Ford, Drake
  - Jim Hart, Southern Illinois
- 2003
  - Johnny Bright, Drake
  - Lew Hartzog, Southern Illinois
  - Cathy Boswell, Illinois State
  - Bruce Baumgartner, Indiana State
  - Will Robinson, Illinois State
- 2004
  - Paul Unruh, Bradley
  - Bob Ehrhart, Drake
  - Arad McCutchan, Evansville
  - John Sanders, Missouri Valley Conference
- 2005
  - Phil Stephenson, Wichita State
  - Chuck Orsborn, Bradley
  - Bob Gibson, Creighton
  - Dr. Charlotte West, Southern Illinois
- 2006
  - Mitchell Anderson, Bradley
  - Carole Baumgarten, Drake
  - Duane Klueh, Indiana State
  - Roland Banks, Wichita State
- 2007
  - Jackie Stiles, Missouri State
- 2008
  - Bob Harstad, Creighton
  - Kevin Little, Drake
  - Ed Jucker, Cincinnati
  - A.J. Robertson, Bradley
  - Jim Byers, Evansville
  - Jill Hutchison, Illinois State
  - Mark Stillwell, Missouri State
- 2009
  - Junior Bridgeman, Louisville
  - John Coughlan, Illinois State
  - Eddie Hickey, Creighton/Saint Louis
  - Lorri Bauman, Drake
  - John Wooden, Indiana State
  - John L. Griffith, Drake
  - Jimmy Wright, Missouri State
- 2010
  - Kyle Korver, Creighton
  - Rich Herrin, Southern Illinois
  - Cheryl Burnett, Missouri State
  - Fred Huff, Southern Illinois
- 2011
  - Joe Allen, Bradley
  - Johnny Torres, Creighton
  - Steve Largent, Tulsa
  - Linwood Sexton, Wichita State
  - Iradge Ahrabi-Fard, Northern Iowa
  - Kurt Thomas, Indiana State
- 2012
  - Charlie Spoonhour, Missouri State
  - Denny Crum, Louisville
  - Joey Woody, Northern Iowa
  - Paul Silas, Creighton
  - Connie Price-Smith, Southern Illinois
  - Fred Schmalz, Evansville
- 2013
  - Darren Dreifort, Wichita State
  - Molly O'Brien, Northern Iowa
  - Krissy Meek-Engelbrecht, Evansville
  - Bob Portman, Creighton
  - Jim Bain, Missouri Valley Conference
  - Nancy Stefani, Drake
- 2014
  - Steve Finley, Southern Illinois
  - Chris Bucknam, Northern Iowa
  - Gavin Glinton, Bradley
  - Linda Herman, Illinois State
  - Bob King, Indiana State
  - Marty Perline, Wichita State
- 2015
  - Mike Glenn, Southern Illinois
  - Roger Phegley, Bradley
  - Linda Dollar, Missouri State
  - Roger Counsil, Indiana State
  - D.A. Weibring, Illinois State
  - Joe Mitch, Missouri Valley Conference
- 2016
  - Anthony Parker, Bradley
  - Mick Lyon, Evansville
  - Sue Daggett Miller, Illinois State
  - Dave Bergman, Illinois State
  - Jerry Harkness, Loyola
  - Bill Thomas, Missouri State
  - Harold Bardo, Southern Illinois
- 2017
  - Marcus Pollard, Bradley
  - Eric Wedge, Wichita State
  - Dr. Don Beggs, Wichita State/SIU
  - Dr. Donald Boydston, Southern Illinois
  - Charlotte Lewis, Illinois State
  - Dr. Mary Jo Wynn, Missouri State
- 2018
  - Darren Brooks, Southern Illinois
  - Christian Goy, Illinois State
  - Mary Ellen Hill, Bradley
  - Lois Patton, Evansville
  - Bill Rowe, Missouri State
  - Dani Tyler, Drake
- 2019
  - Kristi Cirone, Illinois State
  - John McNichols, Indiana State
  - Dolph Pulliam, Drake
  - Bill Smith, Iowa State
  - Joe Stowell, Bradley
  - Kent Williams, Southern
- 2020
  - Phog Allen, Kansas
  - Larry Humes, Evansville
  - Kylie Hutson, Indiana State
  - Richard Jones, Southern Illinois
  - Bill Mueller, Missouri State
  - Mike Prior, Illinois State
- 2021
  - Maurice Cheeks, West Texas
  - Joe Greene, North Texas
  - Clark Hetherington, Missouri
  - James Naismith, Kansas
  - Tara Oltman, Easton
  - F. Morgan Taylor, Grinnell
  - Tom Thacker, Cincinnati
  - Connie Yori, Creighton
- 2022
  - Carla Bennett, Drake
  - Doug Elgin, Missouri Valley Conference
  - Tom Jackson, Louisville
  - Cliff Levingston, Wichita State
  - Cindy Scott, Southern Illinois
  - Charley Steiner, Bradley
- 2023
  - Andy Benes, Evansville
  - Melanie Boeglin, Indiana State
  - Barb Gaines, Missouri State
  - Zach Johnson, Drake
  - Tubby Smith, Tulsa
  - Rachel Tejada, Illinois State
- 2024
  - Christy Barrett Sherman, Indiana State
  - Bob Bowlsby, Northern Iowa
  - Curtis Granderson, UIC
  - Boomer Grigsby, Illinois State
  - Tom Lamonica, Illinois State
  - Nolan Richardson, Tulsa
- 2025
  - Lisa Bluder, Drake
  - Tyler Mulder, Northern Iowa
  - Marcellus Sommerville, Bradley
  - Bob Warn, Indiana State
  - Bruce Weber, Southern Illinois
  - Betty Wiseman, Belmont
- 2026
  - Ray Conger, Iowa State
  - Desiraye Osburn Speer, Wichita State
  - Paul Pressey, Tulsa
  - Tina Robbins, Missouri State
  - Phil Rodgers, Houston
