= John Sherman Williams =

American basketball player

Personal information
- Born: October 2, 1963 (age 63) Indianapolis, Indiana
- Listed height: 6 ft 5 in (1.96 m)
- Listed weight: 190 lb (86 kg)

Career information
- High school: George Washington (Indianapolis, Indiana)
- College: Indiana State (1982–1986)
- NBA draft: 1986: undrafted
- Playing career: 1986–1995
- Position: Shooting guard / small forward

Career history
- 1986–1987: Rockford Lightning
- 1987: Wyoming Wildcatters
- 1988: WBL
- 1989: Worcester Counts
- 1990–1991: Erie Wave
- 1991–1995: Athletes in Action

Career highlights
- 2× First-team All-MVC (1985, 1986); 2× Second-team All-MVC (1983, 1984); MVC Newcomer of the Year (1983); AP Honorable mention All-American (1985)

John Sherman Williams (born October 2, 1963) is a retired American basketball player. He was the Missouri Valley Conference (MVC) Newcomer of the Year, was a four-time all-conference pick and led the MVC in scoring (22.8) for the 1985–86 season.

== High school career ==
Born in Indianapolis, Indiana, John S. Williams attended George Washington Community High School, graduating in 1982. He led the Continentals to Sectional titles in 1980 and 1982; reaching the Indiana State Tournament Quarterfinals in 1982. He was the Indianapolis City scoring champ (27.5 ppg) his senior season (1981–82) and ranked sixth in the state. He was named to several All-State teams, including the most prestigious, "Indiana All-Stars," the All-Stars annual series with their Kentucky-based peers is the nation's premier inter-state high school series.

== College career ==
After high school, Williams attended Indiana State University. A three-year starter, he played basketball under head coaches Dave Schellhase & Ron Greene, leading the team in scoring his entire career and rebounding his senior season; he finished his career as the #2 career scorer (2,370 points) and the #10 rebounder (629 rebounds). He was named first team All-Missouri Valley following his junior and senior seasons and second team All-Missouri Valley Conference for his sophomore and freshman seasons. He is one of three “2,000-point” scorers in 125 seasons of Indiana State Sycamores basketball.

During his Senior campaign (1985–86), Williams tied Larry Bird's record of 81 consecutive games in double-figures and ranked in the top 5 in the nation in scoring (25.8 ppg)

He completed his college career as the # 3 scorer in MVC history, trailing Indiana natives, Oscar Robertson and Larry Bird; today, he ranks fifth as Hersey Hawkins and D.J. Balentine surpassed his total.

== Professional career ==
Williams was not selected in the 1986 NBA draft. However, he spent one season in the CBA, four seasons in the WBL and five seasons touring with Athletes in Action. Following his playing career, he returned to his hometown and began a career in coaching at the youth level.

== Legacy ==
In recognition of the Centennial Anniversary of the Missouri Valley Conference, Williams was named as one of the “Top 50” players in Valley history during the 2006–07 basketball season. He left the college game as the #3 scorer in Missouri Valley history; trailing only #1 Oscar Robertson and #2 Larry Bird.
