= Djibril Kante =

American basketball player

Personal information
- Born: April 12, 1980 (age 46) Bloomington, Indiana
- Listed height: 6 ft 7 in (2.01 m)
- Listed weight: 250 lb (113 kg)

Career information
- High school: Bloomington North (Bloomington, Indiana)
- College: Indiana State (1998–2002)
- NBA draft: 2002: undrafted
- Playing career: 2002–2015
- Position: Power forward

Career history
- 2002–2003: Canberra Cannons (Australia)
- 2002–2003: Atenas (Argentina)
- 2003–2004: Regatas (Argentina)
- 2004–2005: Olimpico LB (Argentina)
- 2005–2006: MH Basket (Argentina)
- 2006–2007: CDU Conception (Chile)
- 2012: Regatas (Argentina)
- 2013: Atenas (Argentina)
- 2013–2014: Malvin Montevideo (Uruguay)
- 2014–2015: LaSalle-UPB Cochabamba (Bolivia)

Career highlights
- Argentinean Cup; LigaA championship; MVC All-Newcomer (1999)

Djibril Kante (born April 12, 1980) is an American basketball player who played professionally in Australia's National Basketball League (NBL), the Argentine National Basketball League, the Chilean Liga Nacional Movistar, Uruguay's Liga Uruguaya de Basketball and last played for LaSalle-UPB Cochabamba in Bolivia's Libobasquet.

External videos
- Booknotes interview with William Gildea on Where the Game Matters Most, February 22, 1998, C-SPAN

Kante, a 6'8" forward from Bloomington High School North in Bloomington, Indiana, had an outstanding high school career; as a junior, he led his team to a 28–1 record and the last (1997) single class State championship; arguably the last true state title in Indiana's storied basketball history. After his senior year, he was selected as an Indiana All-Star. He and his teammates were among the main subjects of William Gildea's 1997 book, Where the Game Matters Most.

He chose to play collegiately at Indiana State University in Terre Haute, Indiana. While there, Kante was a two-year starter and as a sophomore in the 1999–2000 season led the Sycamores to their first NCAA tournament appearance in 21 years; as a junior he led them to an MVC Tournament title and a return to the NCAA tournament.

He finished his college career with a MVC championship (2000) and an MVC Tourney title (2001); he is currently #7 in rebounds (669) and #3 in blocked shots (127). He was named to four MVC teams during his career – the 1999 MVC All-Newcomer Team, the 2001 MVC Most-Improved Team, the 2002 MVC All-Academic Team (1st Team) and the 2002 MVC All-Conference Team (Honorable Mention). He was also part of two historic wins against state rival Indiana University; in the 1999 Indiana Classic on IU's home court and again in 2000 when his rebound and outlet to Michael Menser gave the Sycamores another win against Indiana.

Following the close of his college career, Kante played in Argentina's National Basketball League for several teams; winning the Argentinian Cup and LigA Championship

Kante is still playing basketball, currently with Regatas in the Argentinian League.
