= Carl Nicks (basketball) =

American basketball player (born 1958)

Personal information
- Born: October 6, 1958 (age 68) Chicago, Illinois, U.S.
- Listed height: 6 ft 1 in (1.85 m)
- Listed weight: 175 lb (79 kg)

Career information
- High school: Englewood Technical Prep Academy (Chicago, Illinois)
- College: Indiana State (1976–1977); Gulf Coast State (1977–1978); Indiana State (1978–1980)
- NBA draft: 1980: 1st round, 23rd overall pick
- Drafted by: Denver Nuggets
- Playing career: 1980–1989
- Position: Point guard / shooting guard
- Number: 3, 12, 22, 24

Career history
- 1980: Denver Nuggets
- 1980–1982: Utah Jazz
- 1981–1982: Billings Volcanos
- 1983: Cleveland Cavaliers
- 1983–1984: Toronto Tornados
- 1984–1985: Saint-Étienne_Basket
- 1985–1987: BC Oostende
- 1987–1989: ASPO Tours

Career highlights
- 2× First-team All-MVC (1979, 1980); No. 22 jersey retired by Indiana State Sycamores
- Stats at NBA.com
- Stats at Basketball Reference

Orlando Carl Nicks (born October 6, 1958) is an American former National Basketball Association (NBA) player. He played college basketball for the Indiana State Sycamores.

== Amateur career ==
A 6'1" combo guard, Nicks played high school basketball at Englewood High School in Chicago and then signed to play college basketball at Indiana State. Nicks played sparingly in his first season, averaging 2.2 ppg in 24 games played. In academic trouble with a 1.6 GPA, Bob King, the head coach, recommended that Nicks leave the Sycamores and go to a junior college to work on his academic and basketball skills. He spent the 1977–78 season at Gulf Coast Community College in Panama City, Florida, where he averaged 22.4 ppg. Nicks credited the experience, stating, "I wanted to play basketball. I respect the game. I know I can play this game. I know I can play this game at the highest level. I knew that. So I went down there and I grinded. I was isolated and it made me grow up."

With a 3.5 GPA in hand, a focused Nicks returned to Indiana State, averaging 19.3 ppg, earning the nickname "Mr. Intensity." Nicks combined with teammate Larry Bird in 1978-79, and helped lead Indiana State to the championship game in the NCAA tournament, with their only loss coming in the final, with the Magic Johnson led Michigan State Spartans defeating the Sycamores 75–64.

In his senior season, Nicks averaged 26.8 ppg, earning honorable mention All-American. Nicks was twice named to the All-Missouri Valley Conference first team (1979, 1980). He was also named to the USA Select Team in 1979 for a tour of the People's Republic of China.

== Professional career ==
After being selected by the Denver Nuggets with the 23rd overall pick in the 1980 NBA draft, Nicks played for Denver, averaging 6.1 ppg in 27 games before being traded to the Utah Jazz in December 1980. He would finish the season with the Jazz, averaging 6.3 ppg. He would spend the 1981-82 season in Utah, averaging 7.4 ppg in 80 games played. He was released by the Jazz at the end of the season, but signed as a free agent by the Cleveland Cavaliers, playing 9 games for the Cavs in their 1982-83 season before his release, bringing his NBA career to a close. In 156 career NBA games, Nicks averaged 16 minutes, 6.8 points, 1.9 rebounds and 1.6 assists.

He spent played for the Toronto Tornados of the Continental Basketball Association (CBA) during the 1983–84 season, averaging 24.3 ppg. Nicks then spent five seasons in Europe, playing initially for Saint-Étienne in France, and then for two years B.C. Oostende in the Belgian BNXT League (1985–1987). Nick then went back to France, playing for Tours B.C from 1987 to 1989 before retiring.

== Personal life ==
After retiring as a player, Nicks coached alongside Bill Hodges, his former head coach at Indiana State, at Mercer University before moving to Indianapolis in 1998. He was a coach in the Pike Township system and ran a program for at-risk teenagers for Indiana University Health Methodist Hospital before rejoining former Sycamore teammate and then Indiana Pacers president Larry Bird with the Pacers as a scout.

In 2007, Nicks was inducted into the Indiana State Athletics Hall of Fame and his #22 Sycamores jersey was retired in 2018. He reflected on his experiences at Indiana State, stating, "It all worked out for me. If someone had asked me back then if I would ever think about a jersey retirement, I would ask them if they were crazy. But moving forward, it happened ... and I'm just real grateful about it."

== Career statistics ==
Legend
GP	Games played	GS	Games started	MPG	Minutes per game
FG%	Field goal percentage	3P%	3-point field goal percentage	FT%	Free throw percentage
RPG	Rebounds per game	APG	Assists per game	SPG	Steals per game
BPG	Blocks per game	PPG	Points per game	**Bold**	Career high

=== NBA ===
==== Regular season ====
Year	Team	GP	GS	MPG	FG%	3P%	FT%	RPG	APG	SPG	BPG	PPG
1980–81	Denver	27	0	**18.3**	.436	.000	.593	1.8	**3.0**	**1.0**	**.1**	6.1
1980–81	Utah	40	0	15.4	**.510**	.000	.537	1.5	1.7	.8	.0	6.3
1981–82	Utah	**80**	1	16.5	.454	.000	.567	2.0	1.7	.8	**.1**	**7.4**
1982–83	Cleveland	9	**2**	16.4	.441	.000	**.647**	**2.9**	1.2	.7	.0	7.0
Career		156	3	16.5	.462	.000	.570	1.9	1.6	.8	.0	6.8

=== College ===
Year	Team	GP	GS	MPG	FG%	3P%	FT%	RPG	APG	SPG	BPG	PPG
1976–77	Indiana State	24	—	7.0	.370	—	.481	1.1	—	—	—	2.2
1978–79	Indiana State	**34**	—	—	**.464**	—	.667	3.5	—	—	—	19.3
1979–80	Indiana State	27	—	—	.441	—	**.775**	**4.2**	—	—	—	**26.8**
Career		85	—	—	.449	—	.714	3.0	—	—	—	16.8
