= Duane Klueh =

American basketball player and coach (1926–2024)

Personal information
- Born: January 6, 1926 Bottineau, North Dakota, U.S.
- Died: June 2, 2024 (aged 98) Terre Haute, Indiana, U.S.
- Listed height: 6 ft 3 in (1.91 m)
- Listed weight: 175 lb (79 kg)

Career information
- High school: State (Terre Haute, Indiana)
- College: Indiana State (1946–1949)
- NBA draft: 1949: 8th round, –
- Drafted by: Boston Celtics
- Playing career: 1949–1951
- Position: Guard
- Number: 24, 6
- Coaching career: 1955–1967

Career history

Playing
- 1949–1950: Denver Nuggets
- 1950–1951: Fort Wayne Pistons

Coaching
- 1955–1967: Indiana State

Career highlights
- As player: Consensus second-team All-American (1948); NAIA tournament MVP (1948); No. 54 retired by Indiana State Sycamores; As coach: 4× ICC Coach of the Year (1959, 1963, 1966, 1967); 2× ICC champion (1965–1966; 1966–1967)
- Stats at NBA.com
- Stats at Basketball Reference

Duane M. Klueh (January 6, 1926 – June 2, 2024) was an American basketball player and coach. Born in Bottineau, North Dakota, he was raised in Terre Haute, Indiana. He was the head men's basketball coach at Indiana State University for 12 seasons (1955–1967). As a Head Coach, he remains the leader in wins. Klueh played professionally in the NBA from 1949 to 1951.

== Basketball career ==
Klueh had a spectacular collegiate career; as a junior (1947–48) he was #2 in the nation in points scored (597), while ranking #10 in point-per-game (17.6). After leading the Sycamores to the NAIA Finals, he was selected 'All-American' by the Helms Foundation as well as winning the Chuck Taylor Most Valuable Player Award in the 1948 NAIA tournament.

Klueh was taken in the eighth round of the 1949 NBA draft by the Boston Celtics. He never played for the Celtics, but was a member of the Denver Nuggets and Fort Wayne Pistons; averaging over 8 pts during his (2-yr) career.

After his NBA career ended, he returned to Indiana and accepted his first coaching position at Fowler High School in Benton County, Indiana. He was named the Indiana State Head Coach after the 1954–55 season at age 28. He resigned at age 40 (1966–67) citing the rigors and pressures of recruiting.

During his twelve-year tenure, he led the Sycamores to a cumulative record of 182–122, 71–60 in conference play. He won three conference titles and had five post-season berths; his post-season record was 3–6. He also led the Sycamores through their transition from the NAIA to the NCAA.

Klueh is a member of the Indiana Basketball Hall of Fame, (1988), the Missouri Valley Conference Hall of Fame (2006), the NAIA Hall of Fame and was a charter inductee to the Indiana State University Hall of Fame in 1982. He will be inducted into the Small College Basketball Hall of Fame in 2024.

His jersey #54 is only one of five numbers retired by Indiana State University.

Klueh held the career scoring record when he graduated in 1948 and is still in the Top Ten in total points (#9; 1,432 points) and scoring average (#10; 15.7 ppg).

== Tennis career ==
In addition to his success on the collegiate hardwood, Klueh also enjoyed a standout career in tennis; winning the 1948 Little States (Collegiate) Singles Championship in Indiana.

Klueh returned to ISU following his professional basketball career and assumed the role of head tennis coach, leading the Sycamores to a school-record 278 wins during two coaching tenures totaling over 26 seasons. ISU's on-campus tennis complex, constructed in 1996, bears his name.

== Death ==
Klueh died in Terre Haute on June 2, 2024, at the age of 98.

== Career statistics ==
Legend
| GP | Games played | GS | Games started | MPG | Minutes per game |
| FG% | Field goal percentage | 3P% | 3-point field goal percentage | FT% | Free throw percentage |
| RPG | Rebounds per game | APG | Assists per game | SPG | Steals per game |
| BPG | Blocks per game | PPG | Points per game | **Bold** | Career high |

=== Playing ===
==== NBA ====
===== Regular season =====
| Year | Team | GP | FG% | FT% | RPG | APG | PPG |
|---|---|---|---|---|---|---|---|
| 1949–50 | Denver | 33 | .364 | .725 | – | **1.9** | **10.0** |
| 1949–50 | Fort Wayne | 19 | **.438** | .667 | – | 1.5 | 7.6 |
| 1950–51 | Fort Wayne | **61** | .343 | **.734** | 3.0 | 1.3 | 7.4 |
| Career | | 113 | .362 | .719 | 3.0 | 1.5 | 8.2 |

===== Playoffs =====
| Year | Team | GP | FG% | FT% | RPG | APG | PPG |
|---|---|---|---|---|---|---|---|
| 1950 | Fort Wayne | **2** | **.200** | **1.000** | | **1.5** | **4.5** |
| 1951 | Fort Wayne | **2** | .167 | – | 1.5 | **1.5** | 1.0 |
| Career | | 4 | .188 | 1.000 | 1.5 | 1.5 | 2.8 |

=== Head coaching record ===
Record table
| Season | Team | Overall | Conference | Standing | Postseason |
|---|---|---|---|---|---|
**Indiana State Sycamores** (Indiana Collegiate Conference) (1955–1967)
| 1955–56 | Indiana State | 8–16 | 2–10 | 6th | |
| 1956–57 | Indiana State | 12–13 | 2–10 | 6th | |
| 1957–58 | Indiana State | 11–14 | 2–10 | 7th | |
| 1958–59 | Indiana State | 17–10 | 9–3 | 2nd | NAIA Second Round |
| 1959–60 | Indiana State | 7–13 | 4–8 | 4th | |
| 1960–61 | Indiana State | 17–9 | 9–3 | 2nd | |
| 1961–62 | Indiana State | 19–11 | 7–5 | 3rd | NAIA First Round |
| 1962–63 | Indiana State | 18–7 | 8–4 | 3rd | NAIA Second Round |
| 1963–64 | Indiana State | 17–8 | 6–6 | 4th | |
| 1964–65 | Indiana State | 13–10 | 7–5 | 2nd | |
| 1965–66 | Indiana State | 22–6 | 9–3 | 1st-T | NCAA College Division First Round |
| 1966–67 | Indiana State | 21–5 | 11–1 | 1st | NCAA College Division Second Round |
| Indiana State: | | 182–122 (.599) | 76–60 (.559) | | |
| Total: | | 182–122 (.599) | | | |
National champion Postseason invitational champion Conference regular season champion Conference regular season and conference tournament champion Division regular season champion Division regular season and conference tournament champion Conference tournament champion
