= List of NCAA men's basketball retired numbers =

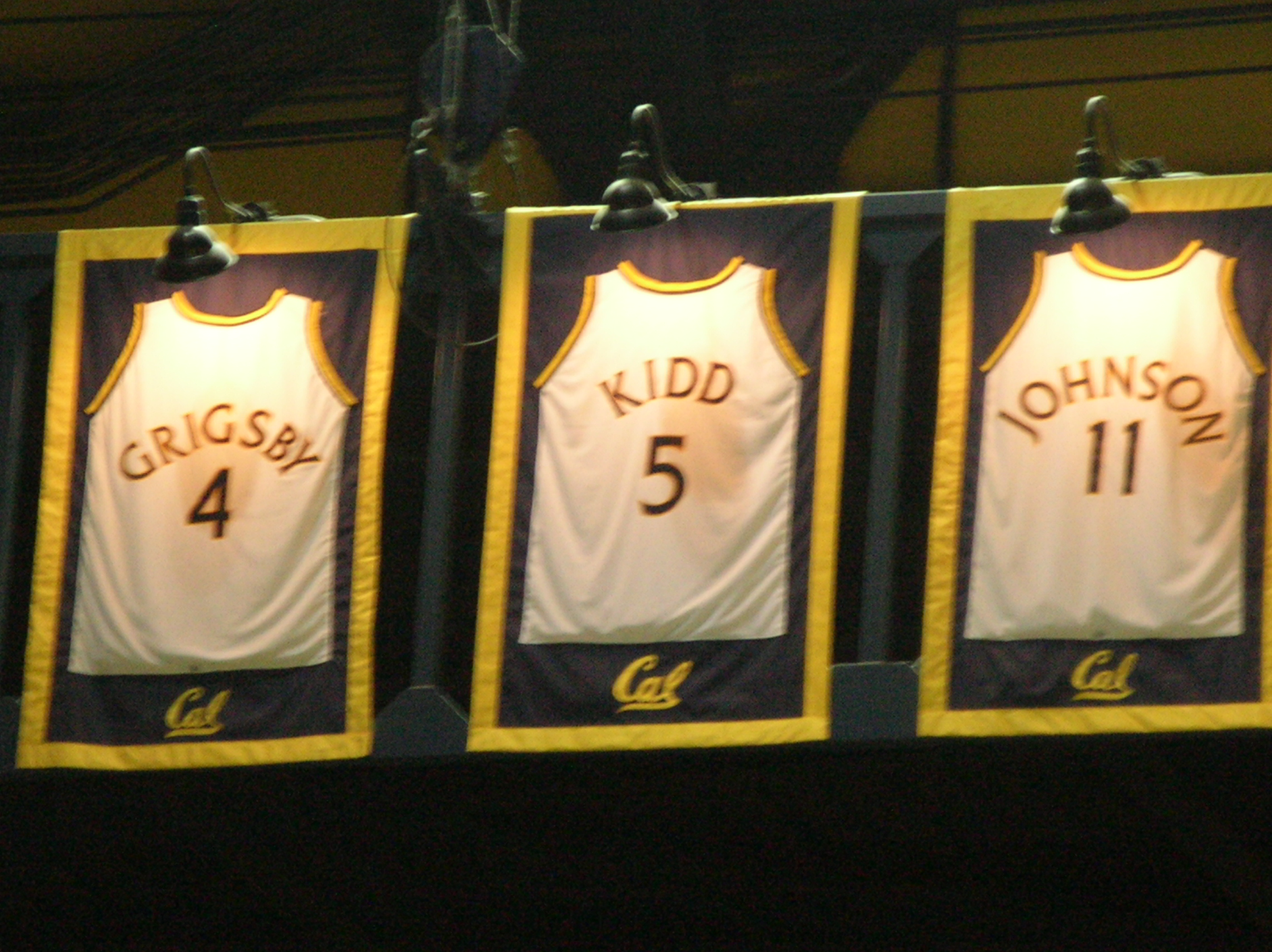
Some of the Cal Golden Bears retired numbers hanging on the rafters at Haas Pavilion, September 2009

Teams in the National Collegiate Athletic Association (NCAA) retire jersey numbers of players who either are considered by the team to have made significant contributions to that team's success, or who have experienced untimely deaths during their playing career. As with other leagues, once a team retires a player's jersey number, it never issues the number to any other player, unless the player or team explicitly allows it.

== History ==
Since NCAA teams began retiring numbers, many players have had their jersey number retired. Murray State University has the most retired numbers among Division I programs, with 15. Unlike professional leagues, no one player has had his number retired by two teams.

Some programs such as Indiana, Kansas, Kentucky, Syracuse, Oklahoma State, Georgetown, Stanford, Maryland, or Baylor, have not officially retired jersey numbers yet. Unlike major sports leagues in the United States such as the NBA (which retired Bill Russell's number 6), MLB (which retired Jackie Robinson's number 42), and the NHL (which did so for Wayne Gretzky's 99), the NCAA has never retired a jersey number league-wide in honor of anyone.

Nevertheless, there are some cases of retirement of a same number honoring two different players, such as the University of Texas at El Paso, which retired number 14 worn first by Bobby Joe Hill (1961–1966) and then by Nate "Tiny" Archibald (1967–70).

== Retired numbers ==
Elected to the Basketball Hall of Fame as a player
Player on a team elected as a unit to the Basketball Hall of Fame

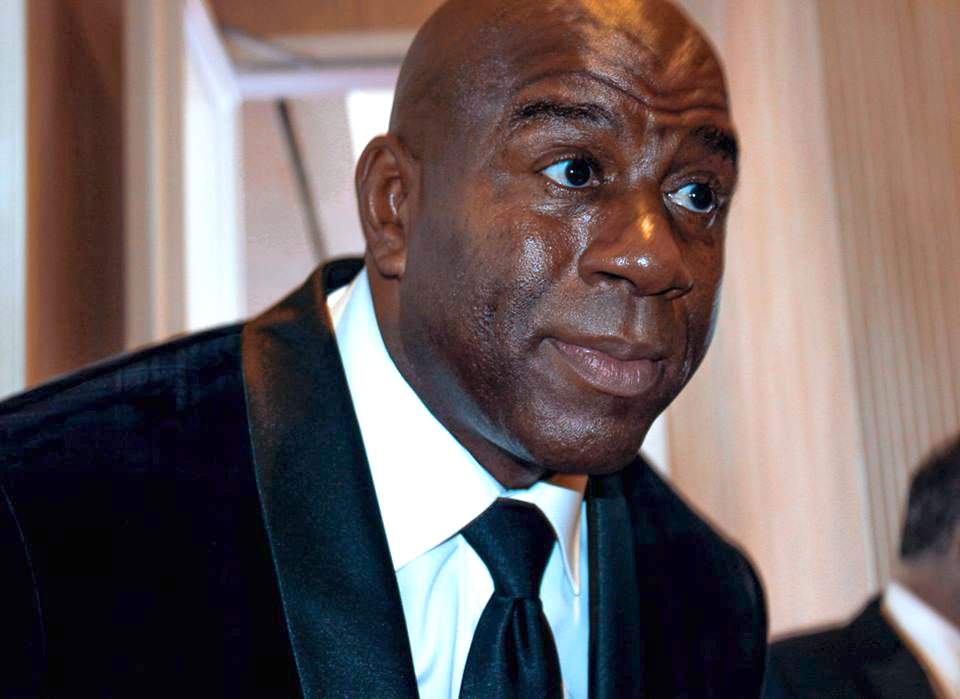
Magic Johnson's #33 was retired by Michigan State

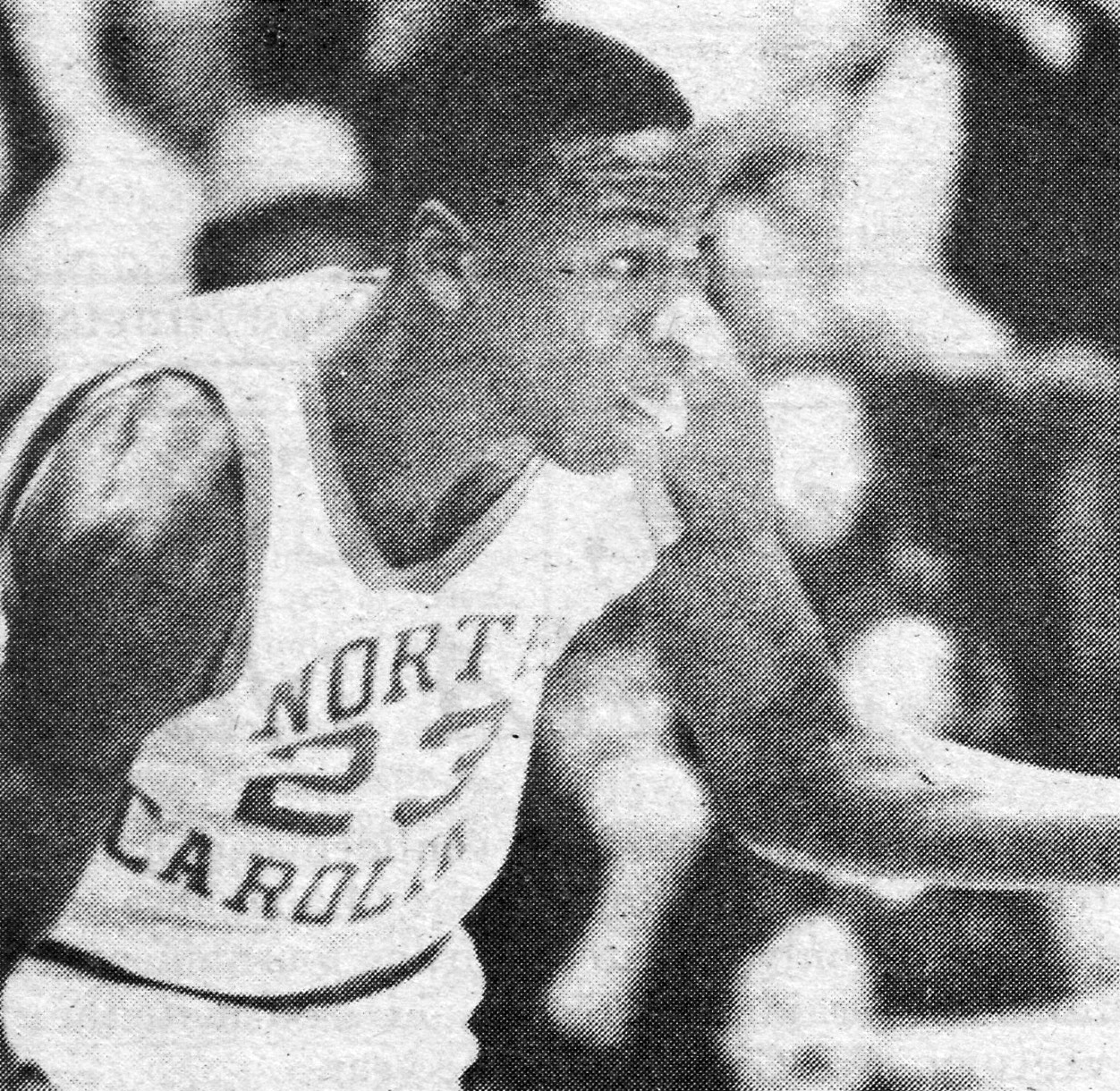
Michael Jordan's #23 was retired by North Carolina

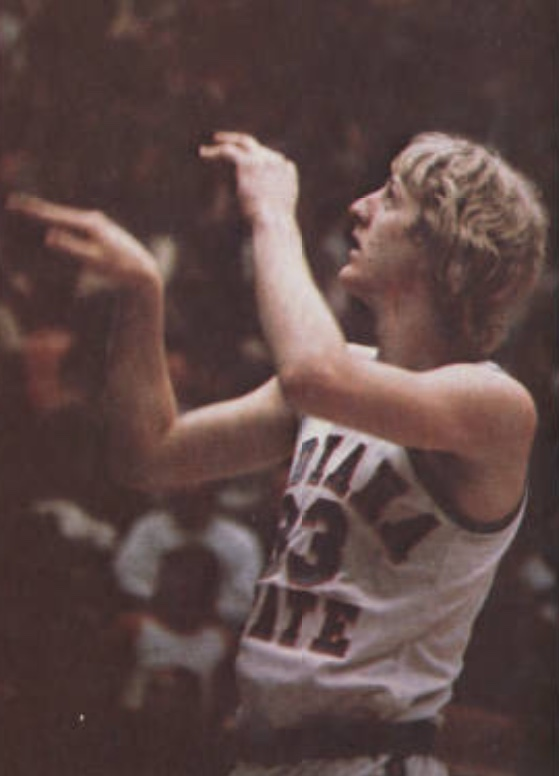
Larry Bird's #33, retired by Indiana State in 2004

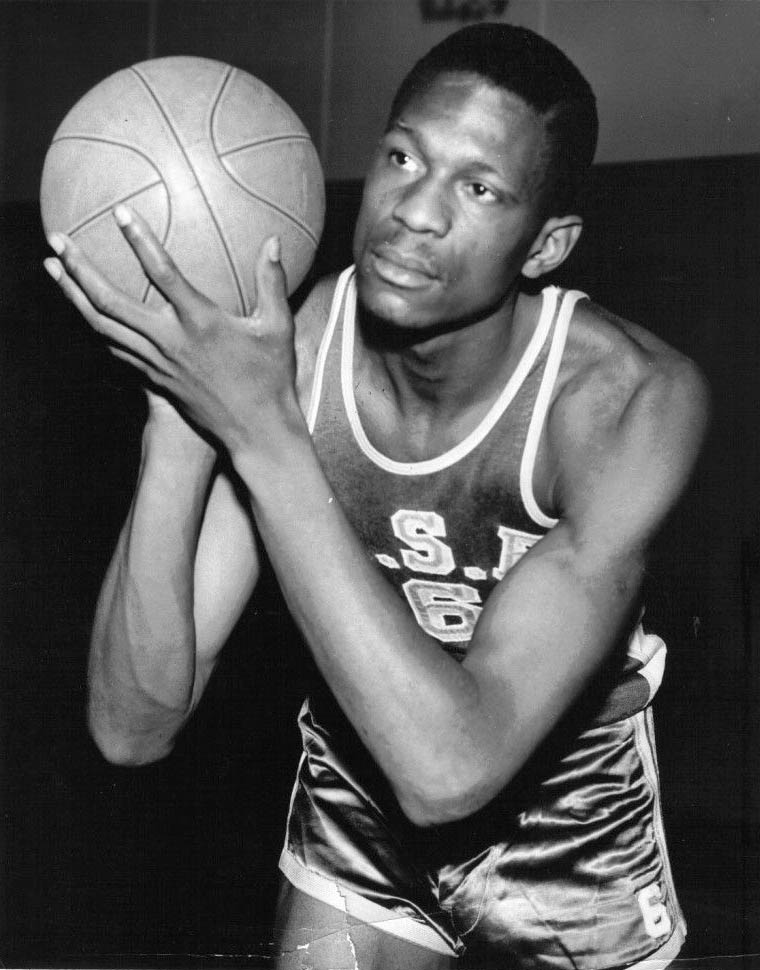
Bill Russell's #6 was retired by San Francisco

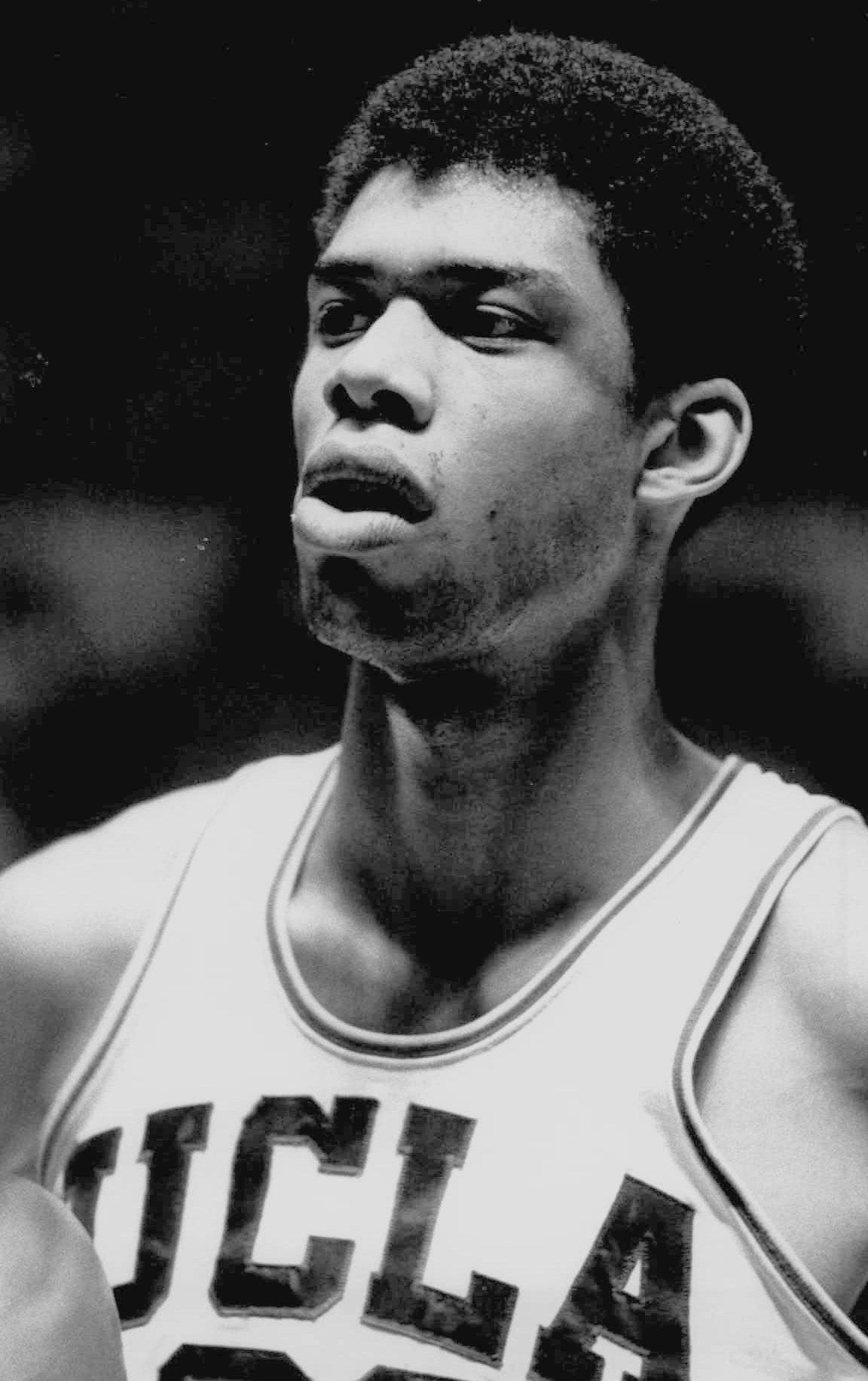
Kareem Abdul-Jabbar's #33, retired by UCLA in 1990

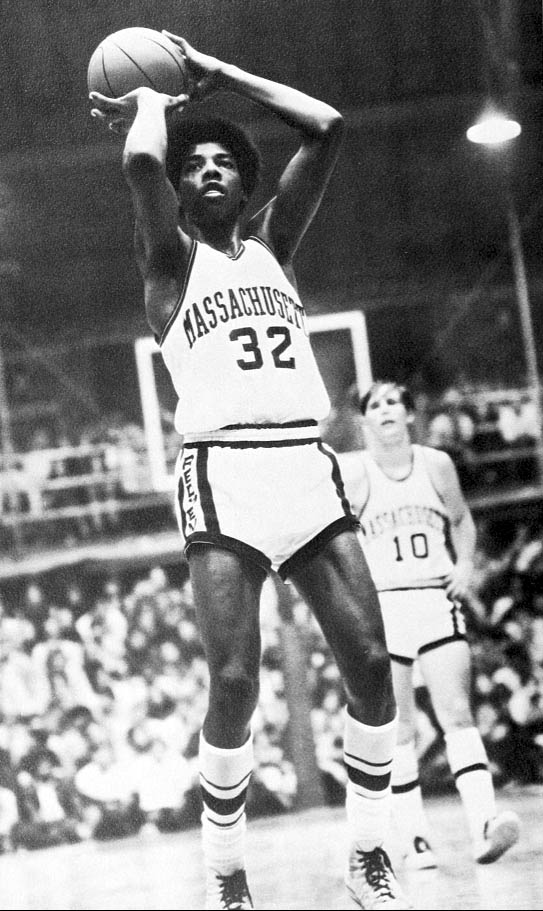
Julius Erving's #32, retired by UMass

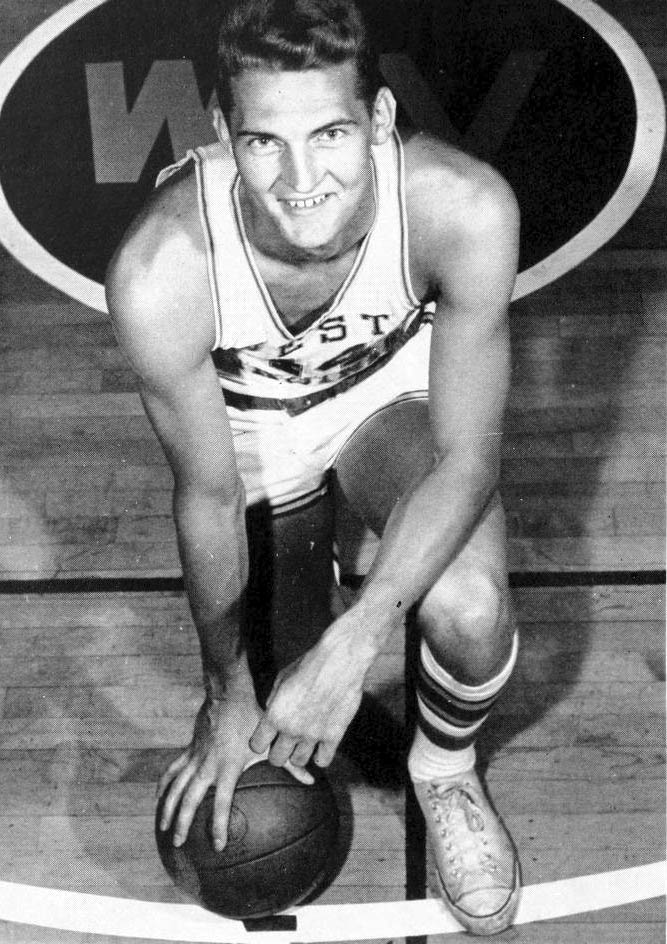
Jerry West's #44, retired by West Virginia

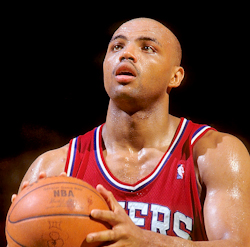
Charles Barkley's #34, number retired by Auburn in 2001

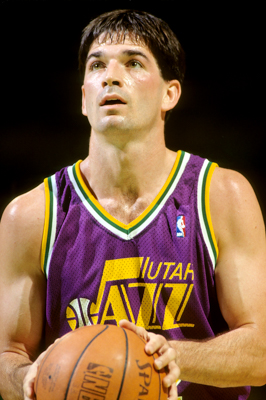
John Stockton's #12, retired by Gonzaga

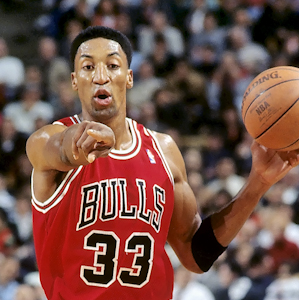
Scottie Pippen's #33, retired by Central Arkansas

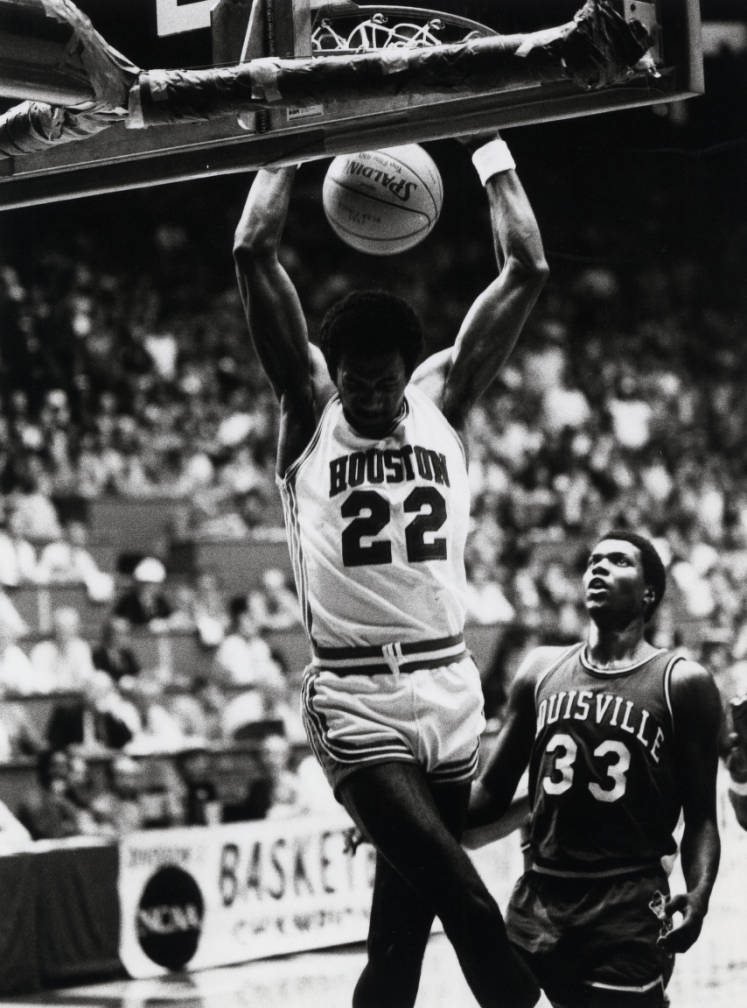
Clyde Drexler's #22, retired by Houston

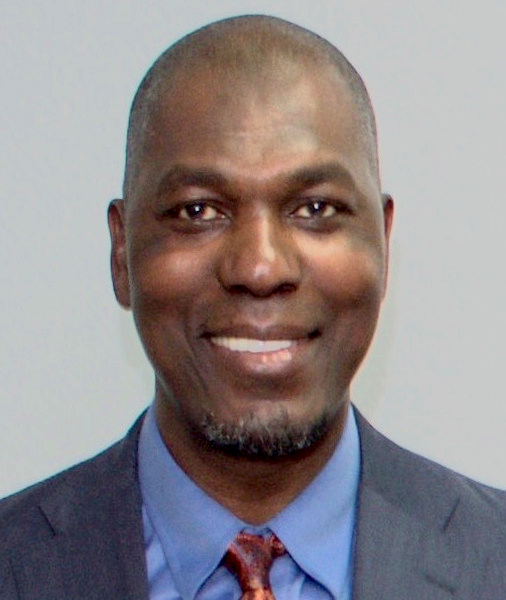
Hakeem Olajuwon's #34, retired by Houston

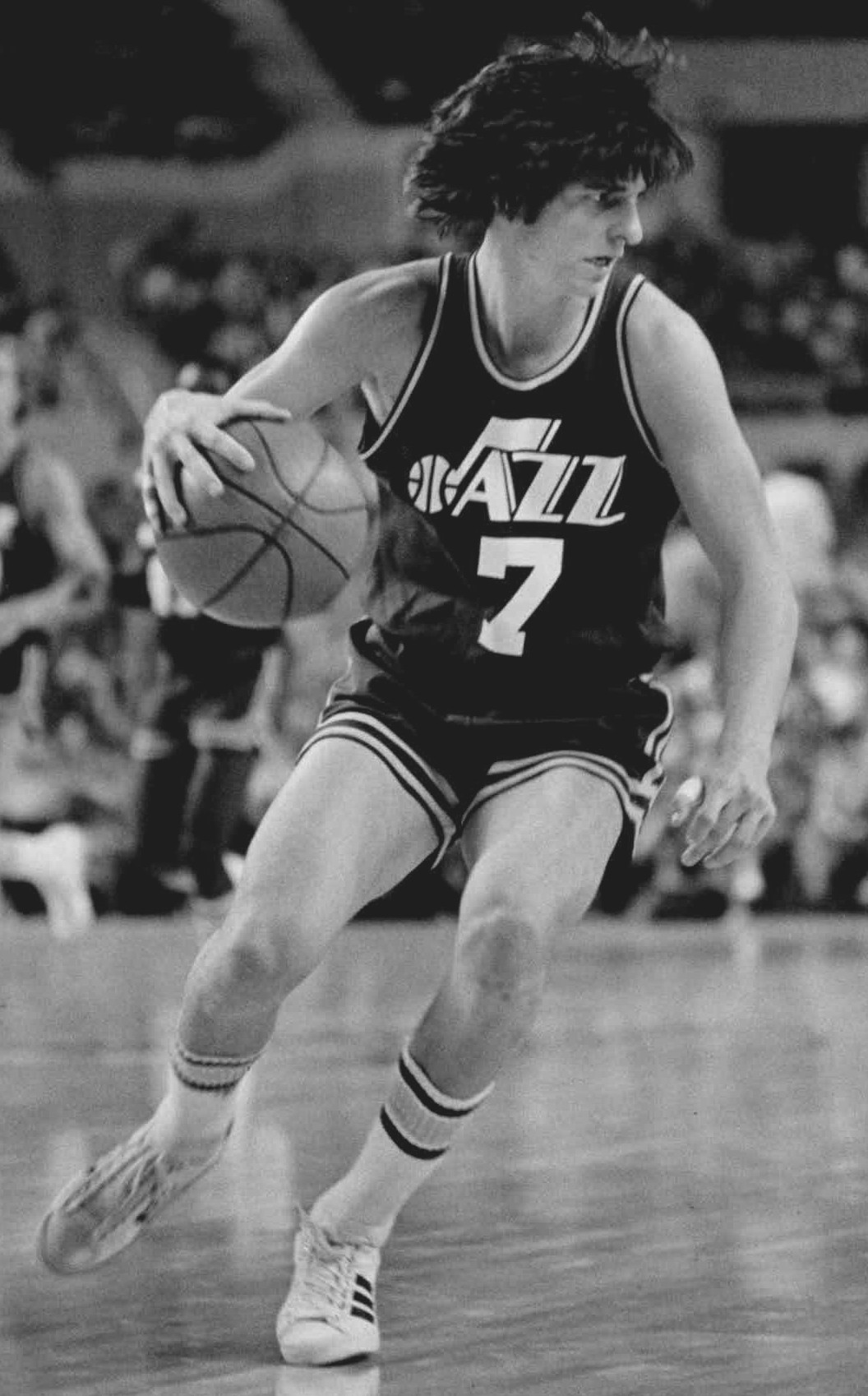
Pete Maravich's #23, retired by LSU

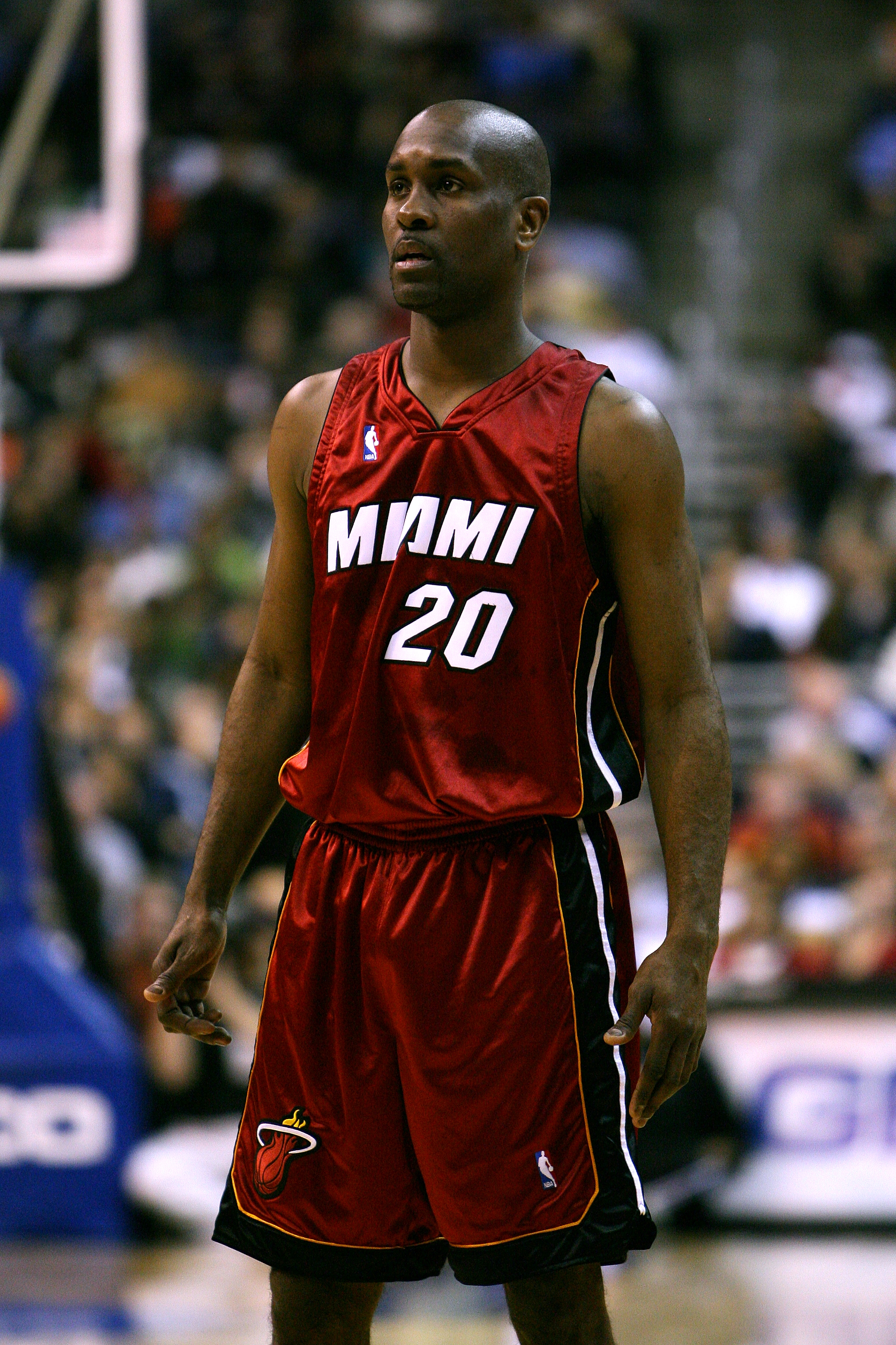
Gary Payton's #20, retired by Oregon State in 1996

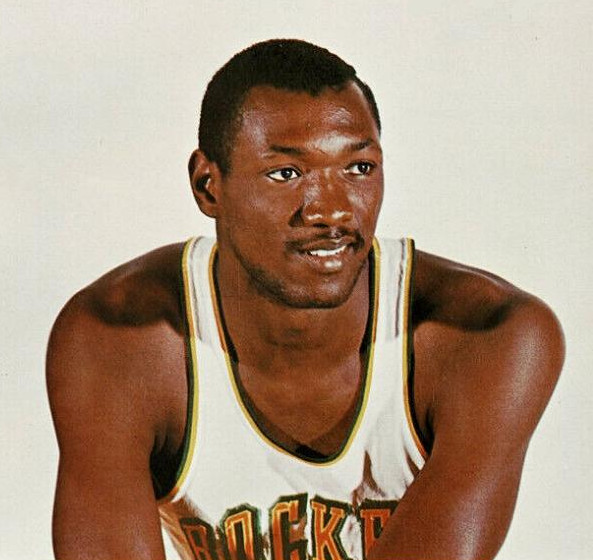
Elvin Hayes's #44, retired by Houston

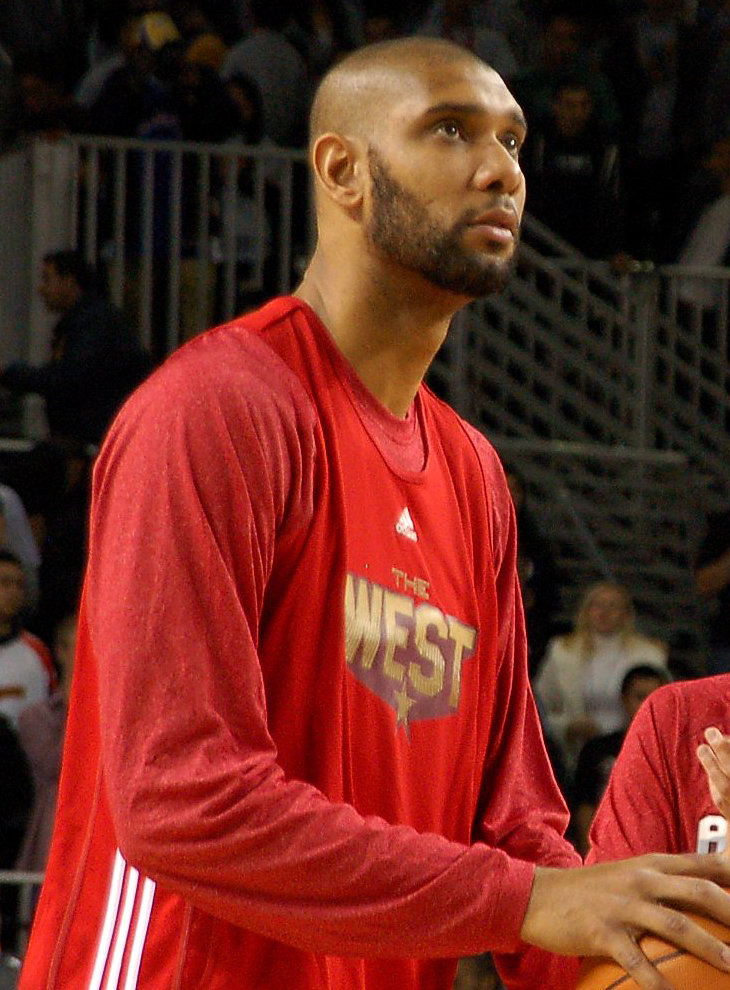
Tim Duncan's #21, retired by Wake Forest

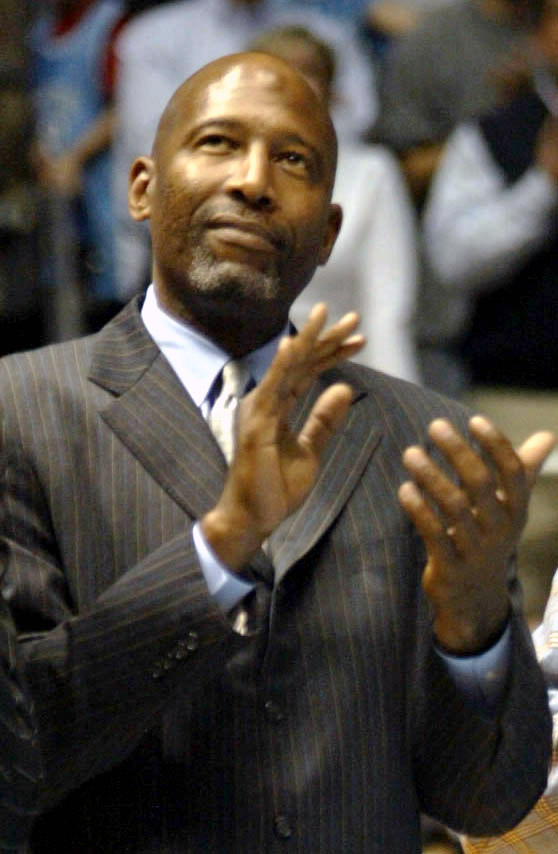
James Worthy's #52, retired by North Carolina

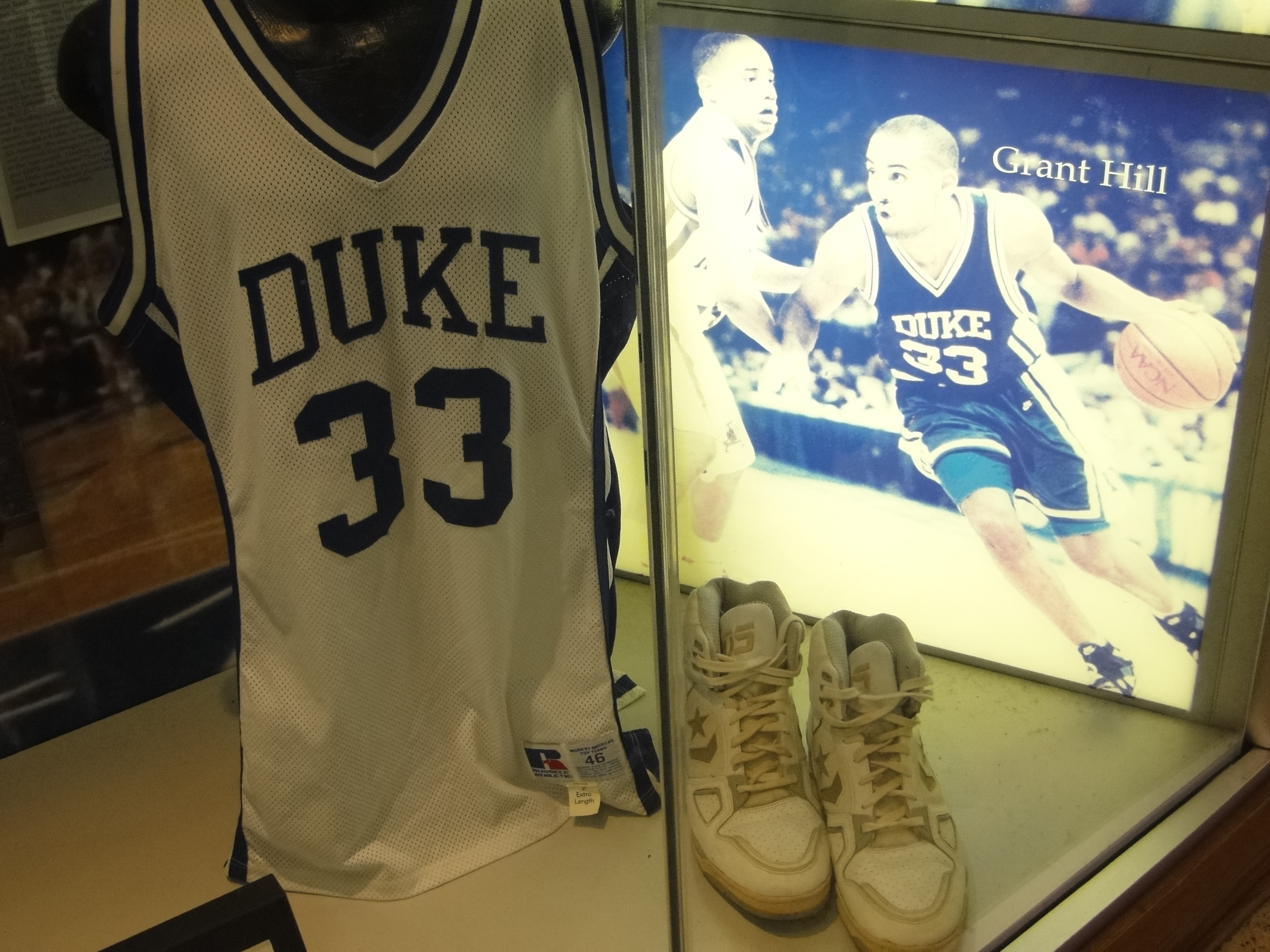
Grant Hill's #33 was retired by Duke in 1994

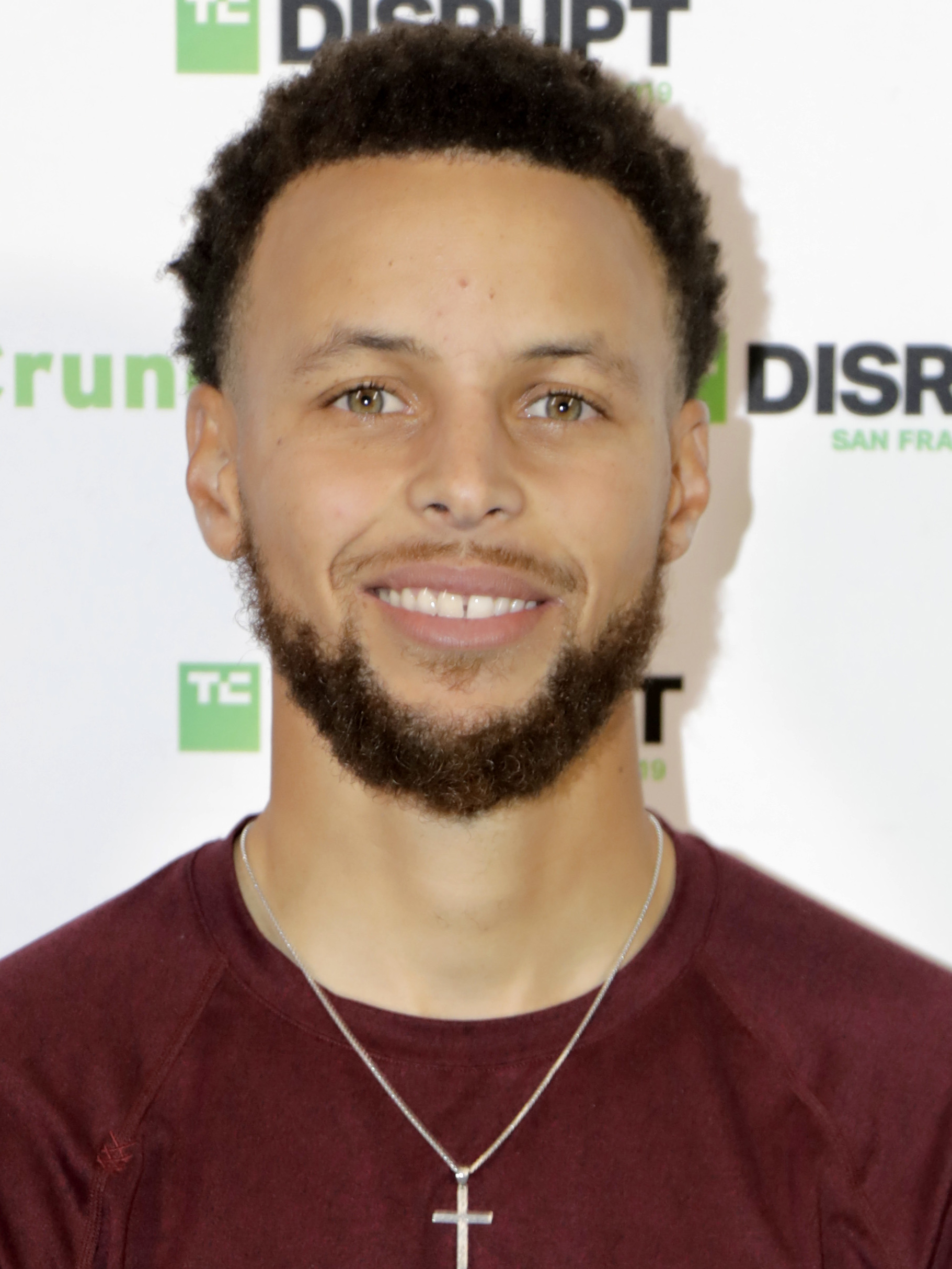
Stephan Curry's #30, retired by Davidson in 2022

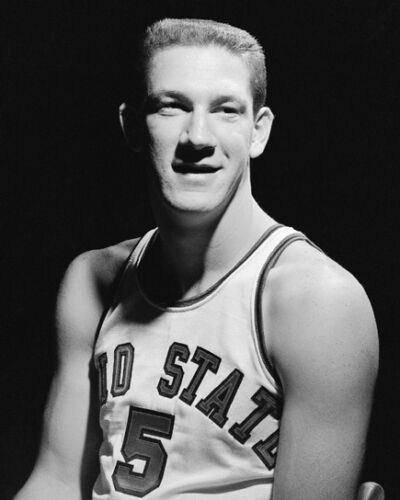
John Havlicek's #5, retired by Ohio State

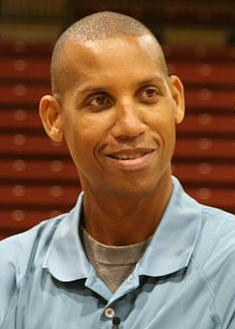
Reggie Miller, whose #31 was retired by UCLA in 2013

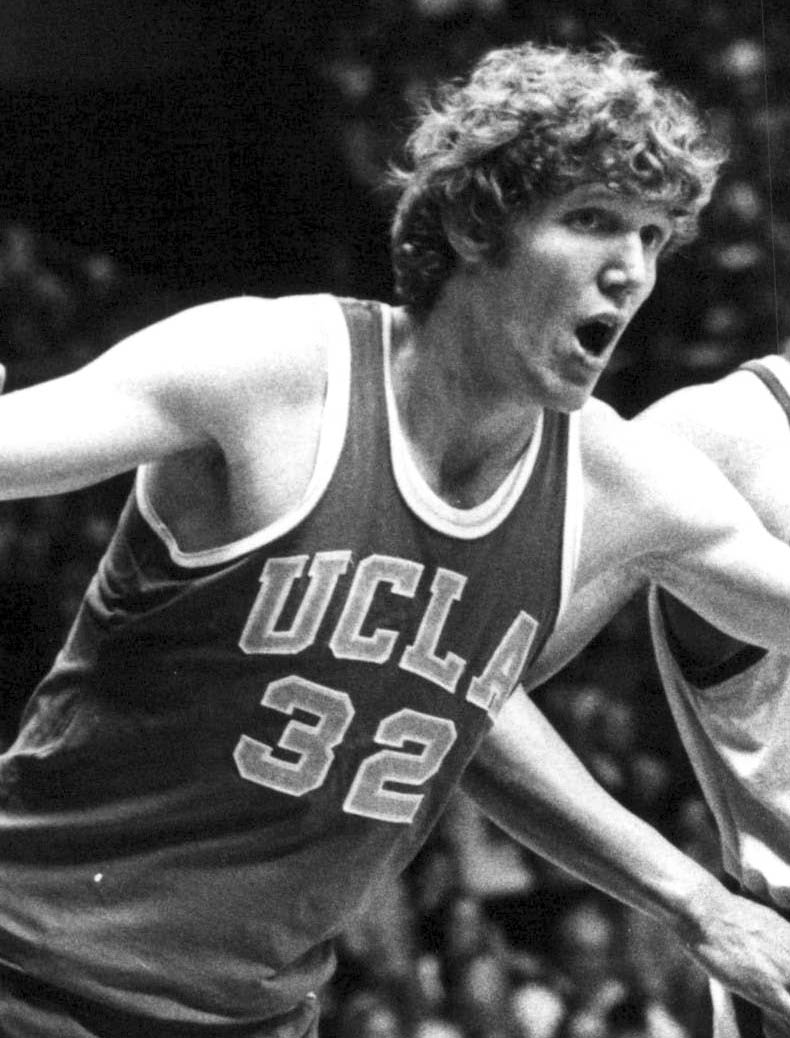
Bill Walton's #32, retired by UCLA in 1990

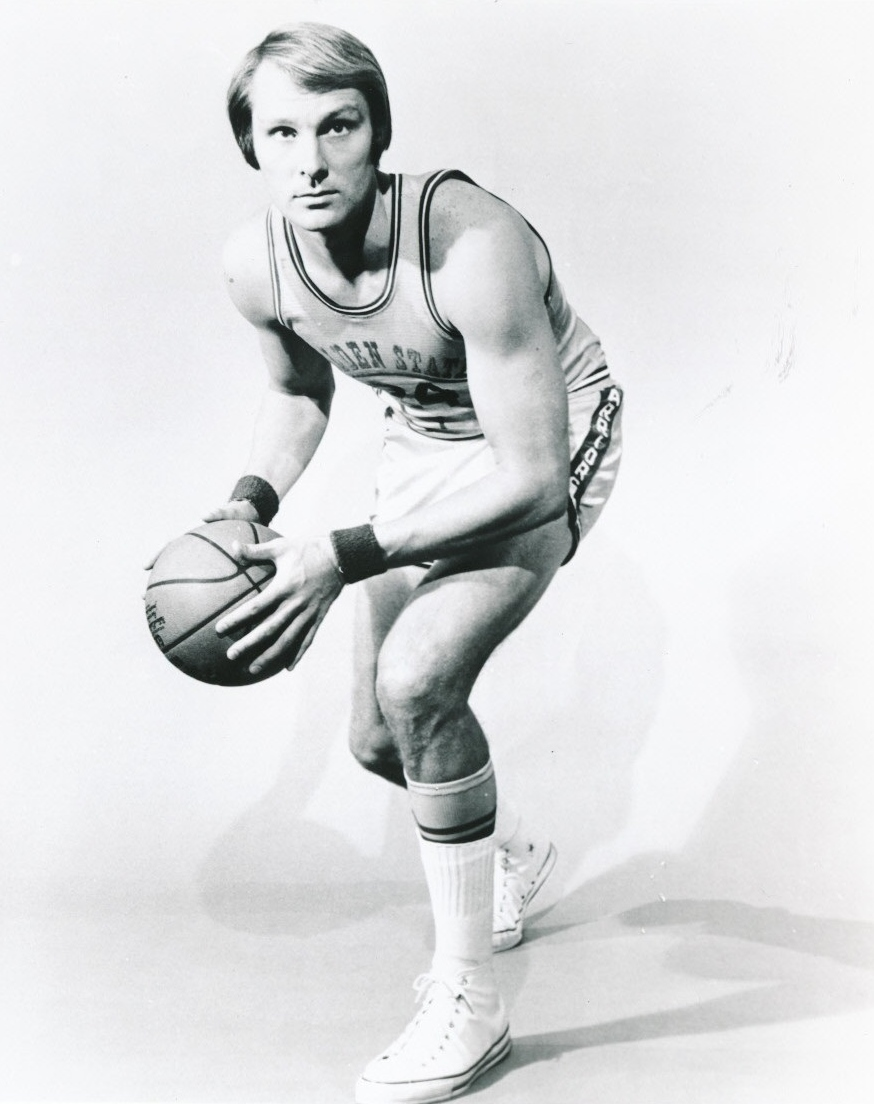
Rick Barry's #24, retired by Miami

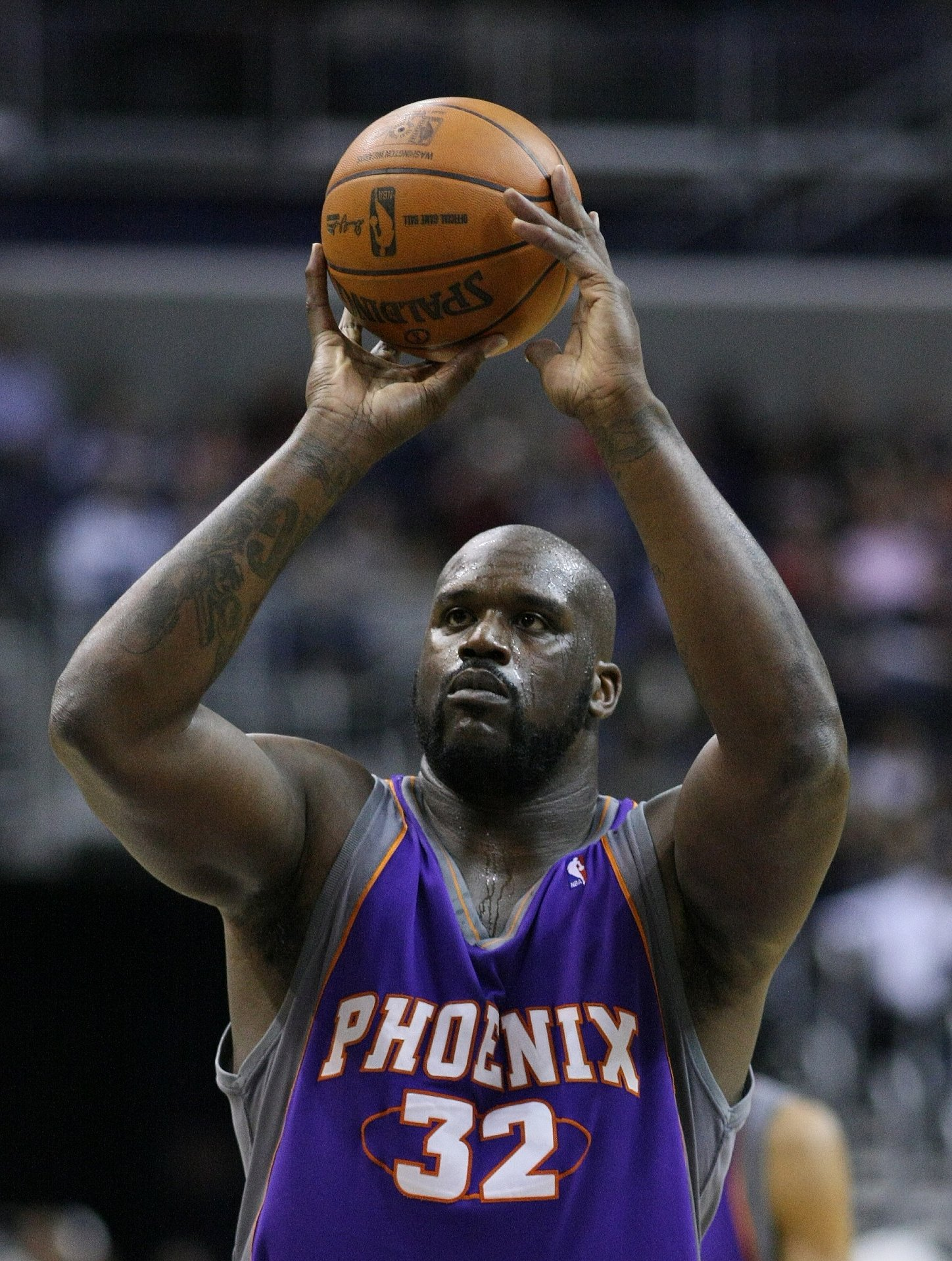
Shaquille O'Neal #32, retired by LSU

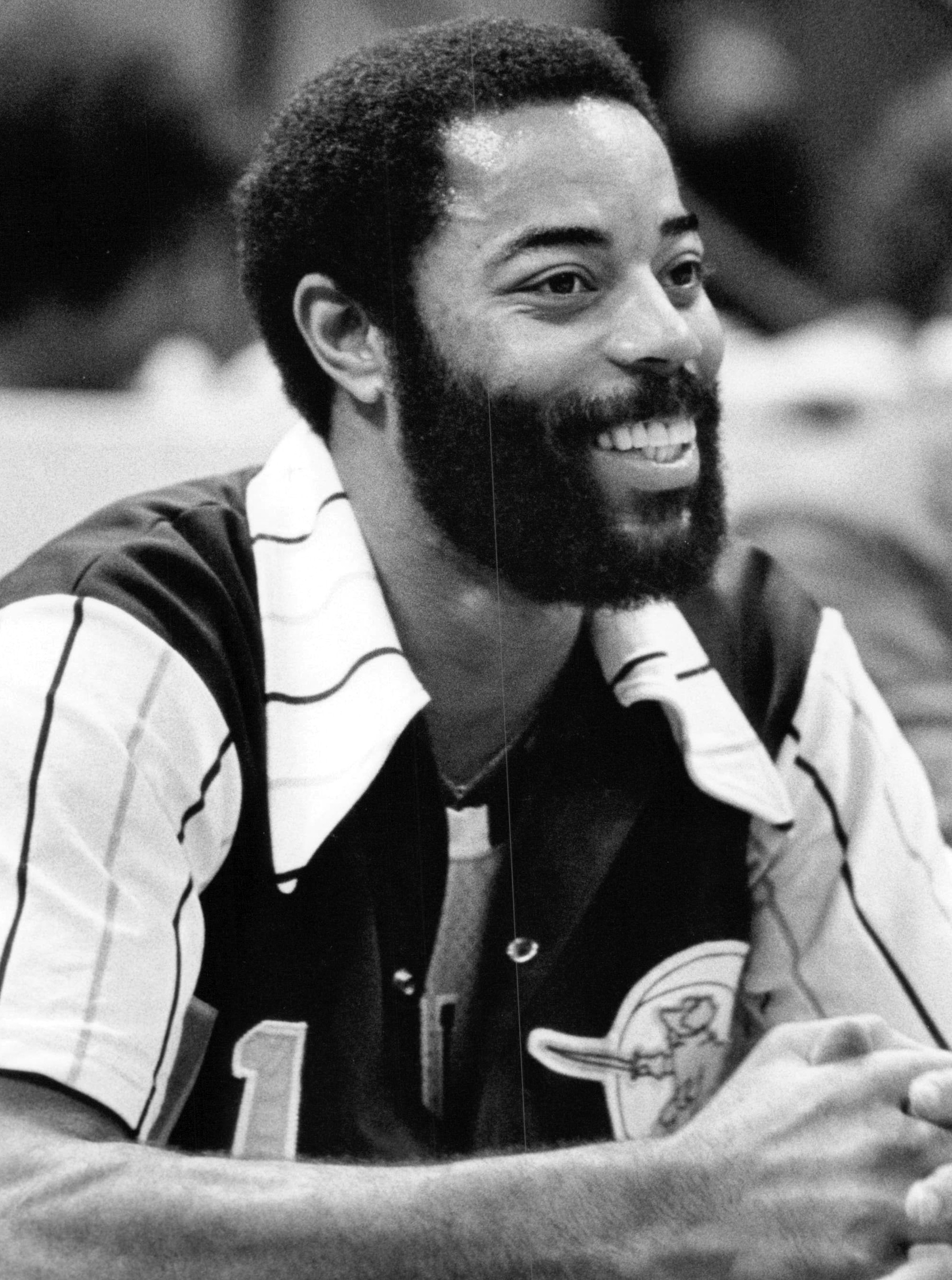
Walt Frazier's #52, retired by Southern Illinois

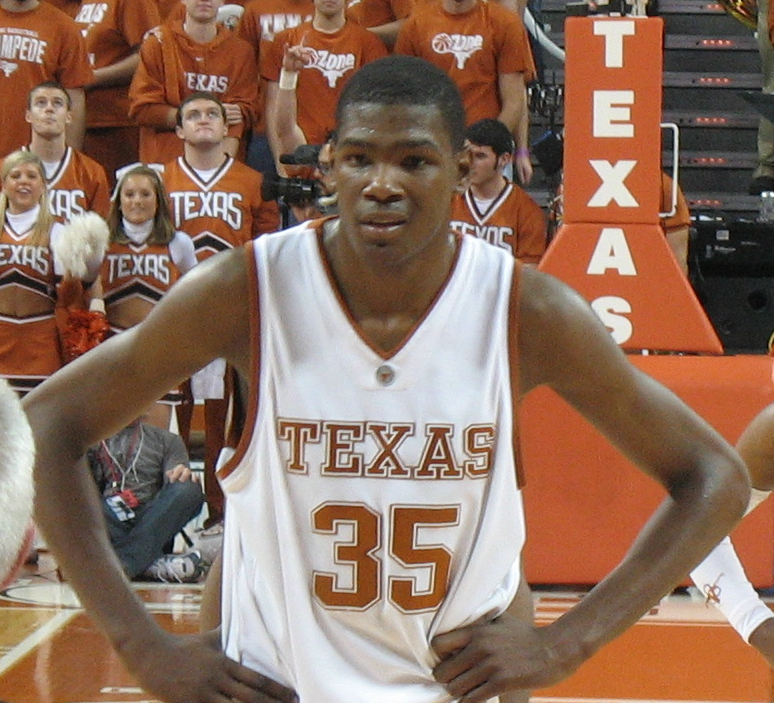
Kevin Durant's #35, retired by Texas

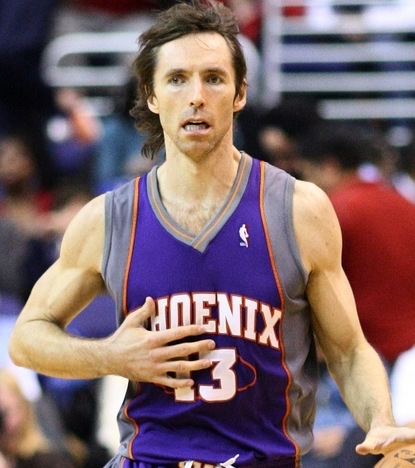
Steve Nash has his #11 retired by Santa Clara

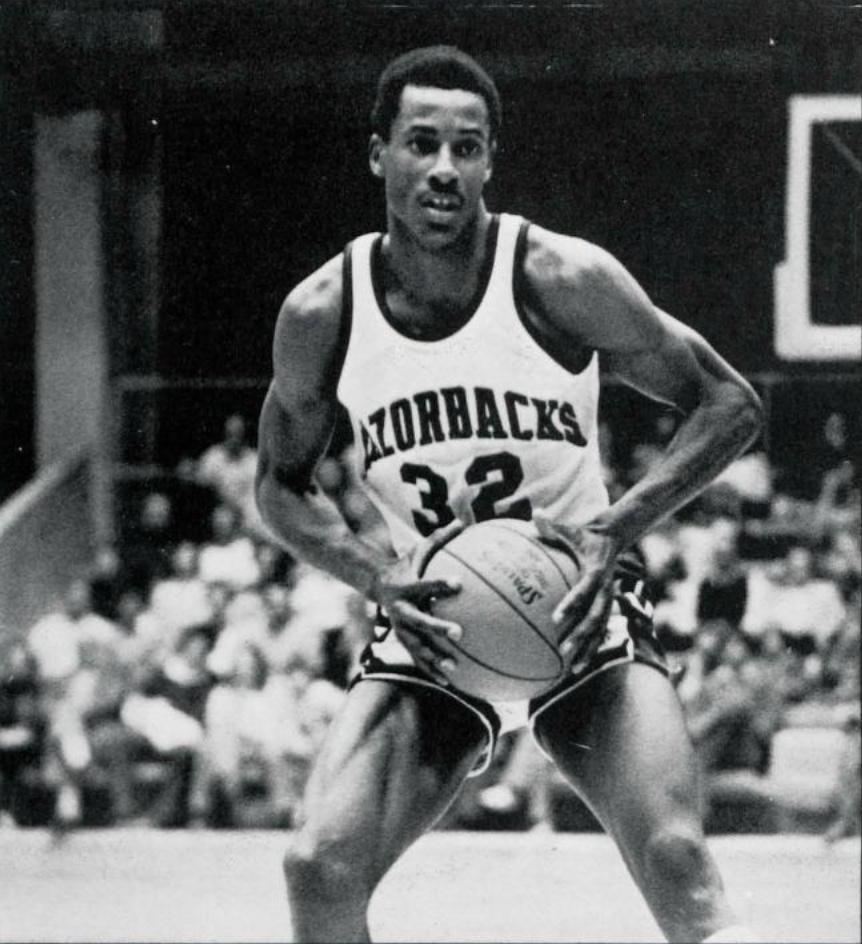
Sidney Moncrief's #32 was retired by Arkansas

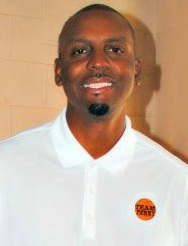
Penny Hardaway's #25, retired by Memphis

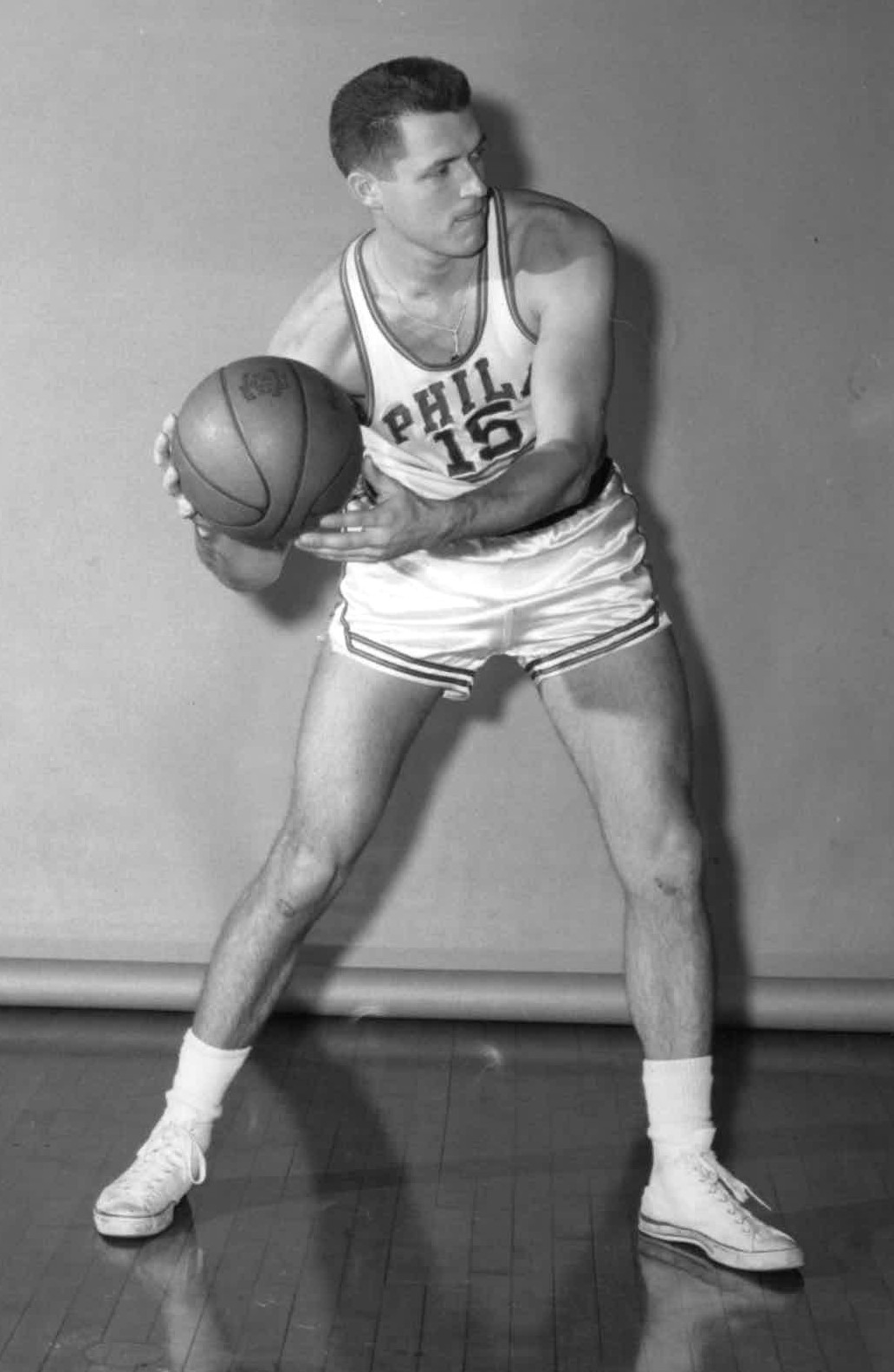
Tom Gola's #15, retired by La Salle

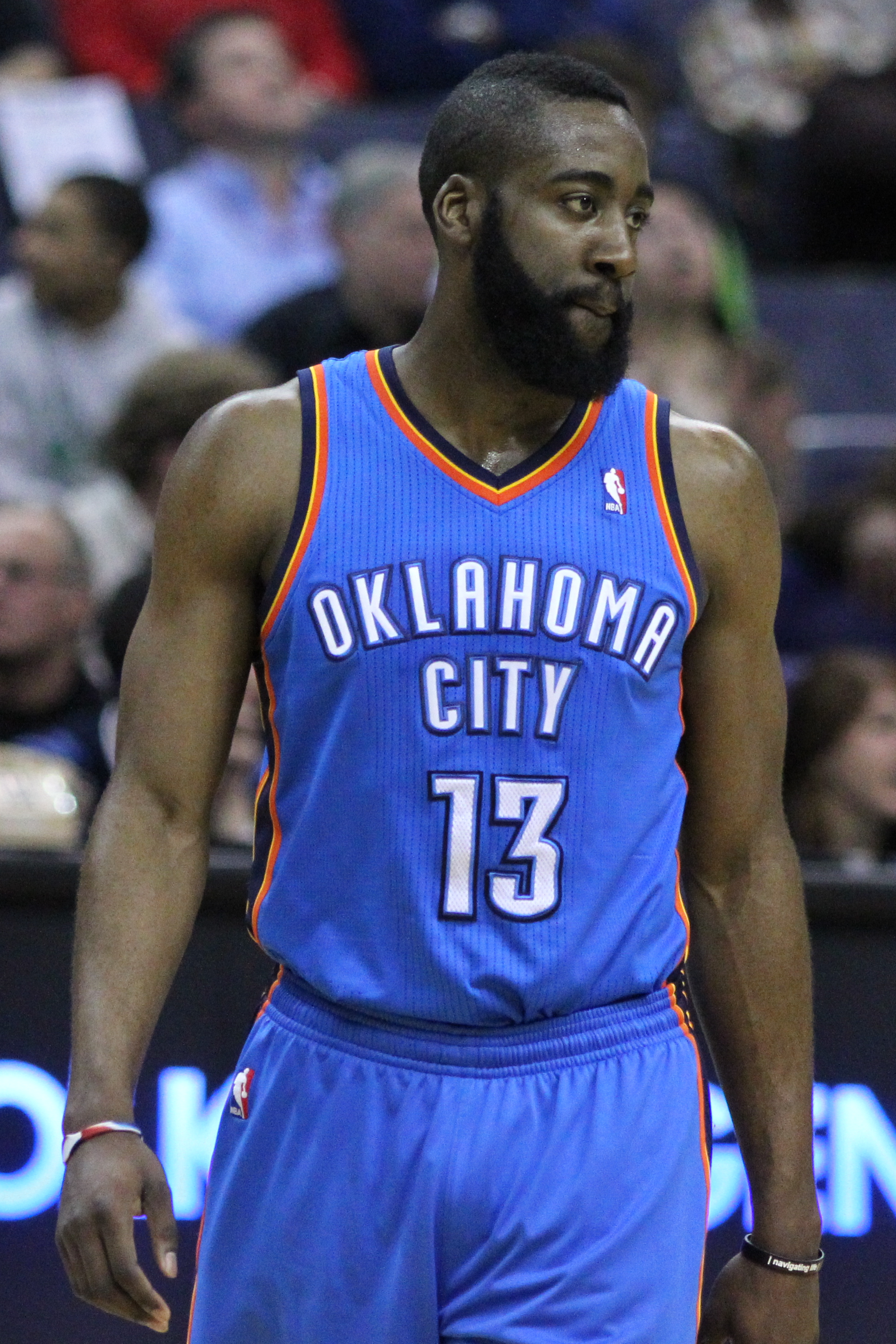
James Harden's #13, retired by Arizona State

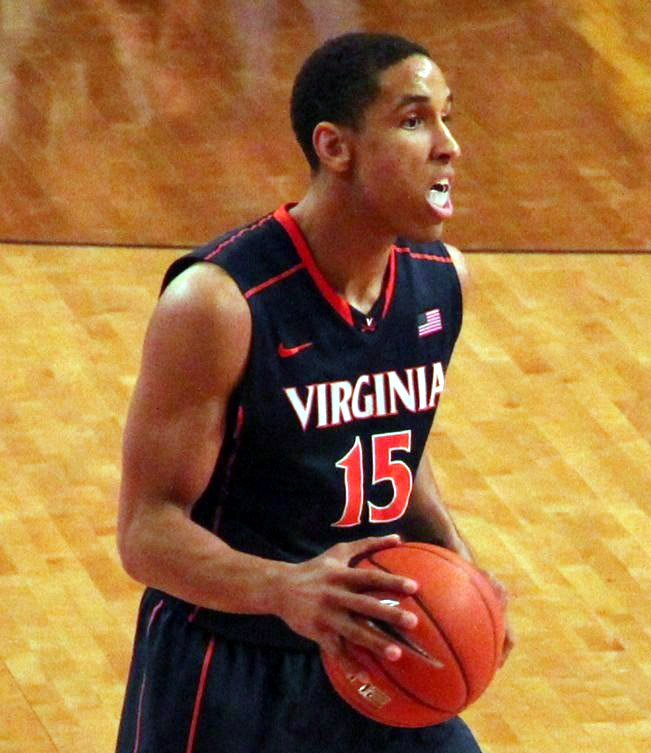
Malcolm Brogdon's #15, retired by Virginia

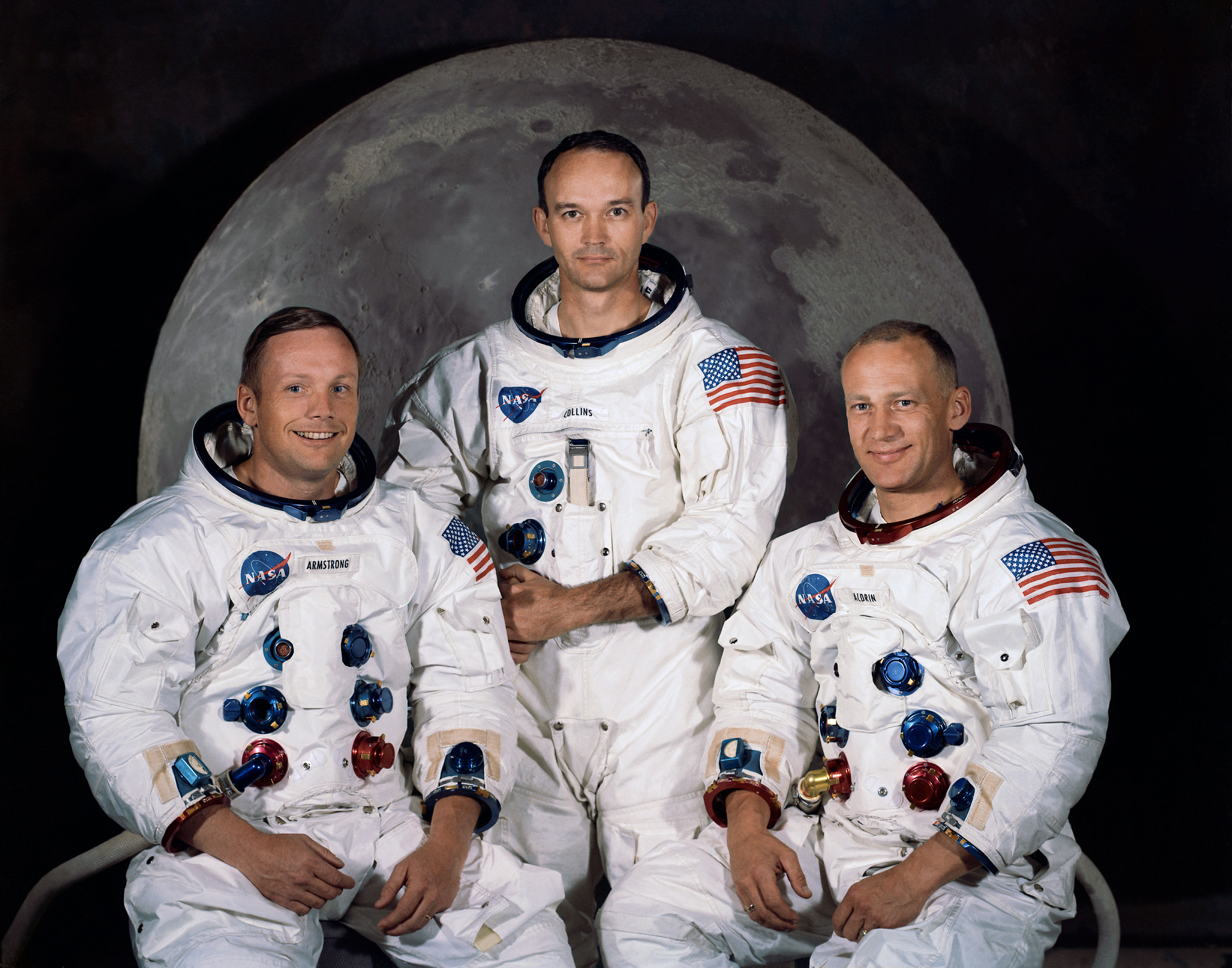
The Apollo 11 crew were honored by Marquette retiring the #11, although they were not related to the athletics program

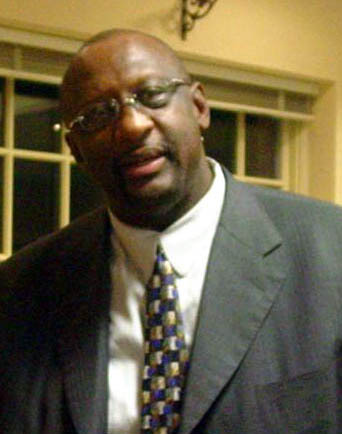
Bob Lanier's #31 was retired by St. Bonaventure

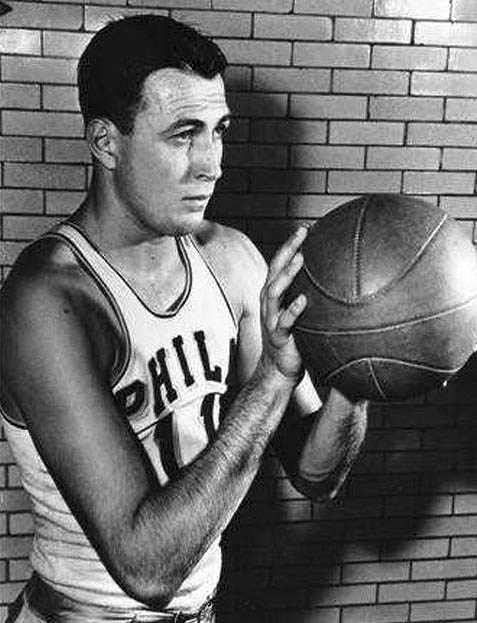
Paul Arizin (here with Philadelphia) has his #11 retired by Villanova

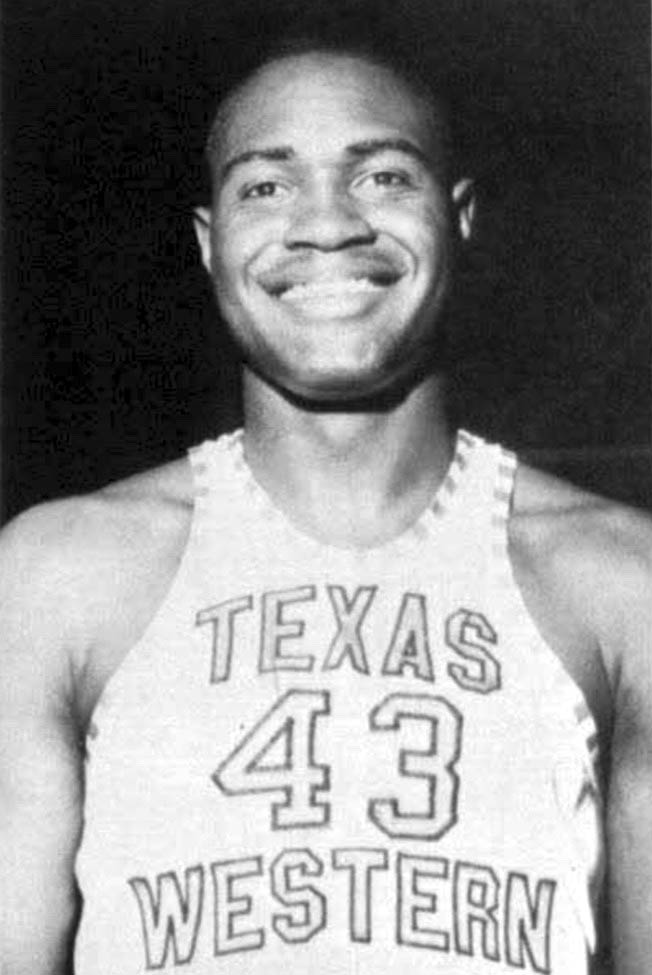
Dave Lattin has his number 43 retired by UTEP

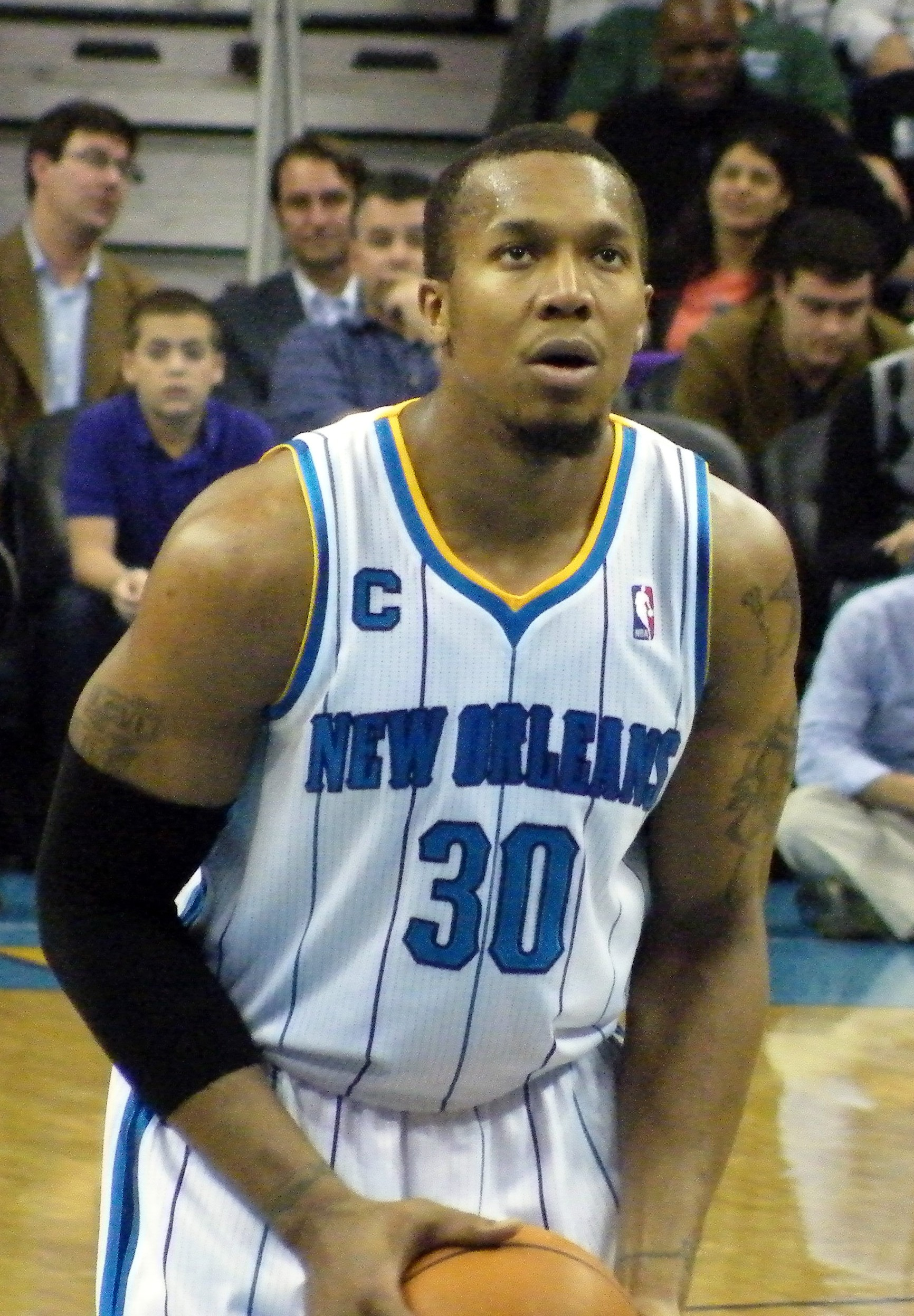
David West's #30, retired by Xavier

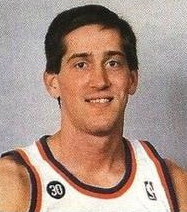
Jeff Hornacek's #14, retired by Iowa State in 1991

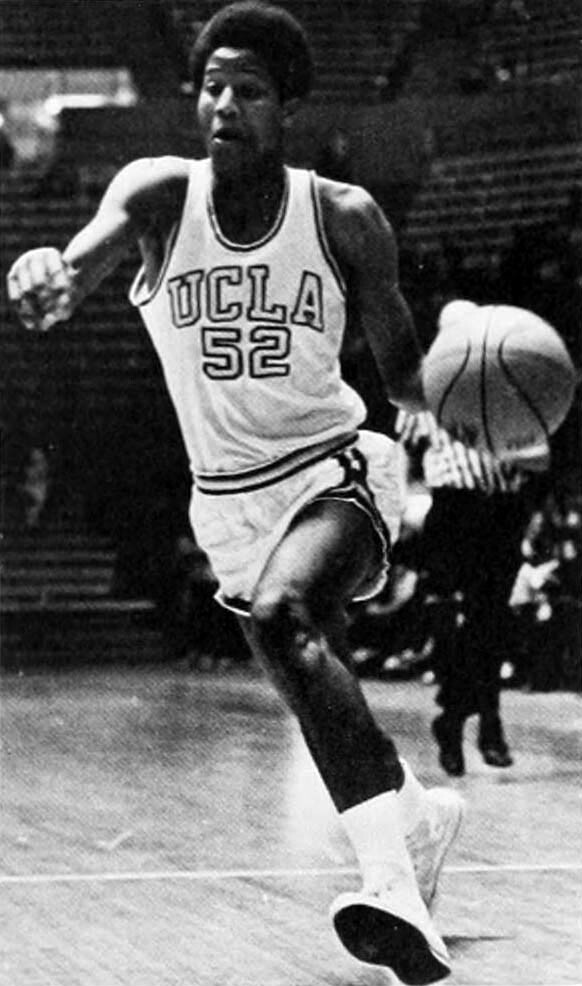
Jamaal Wilkes' #52, retired by UCLA

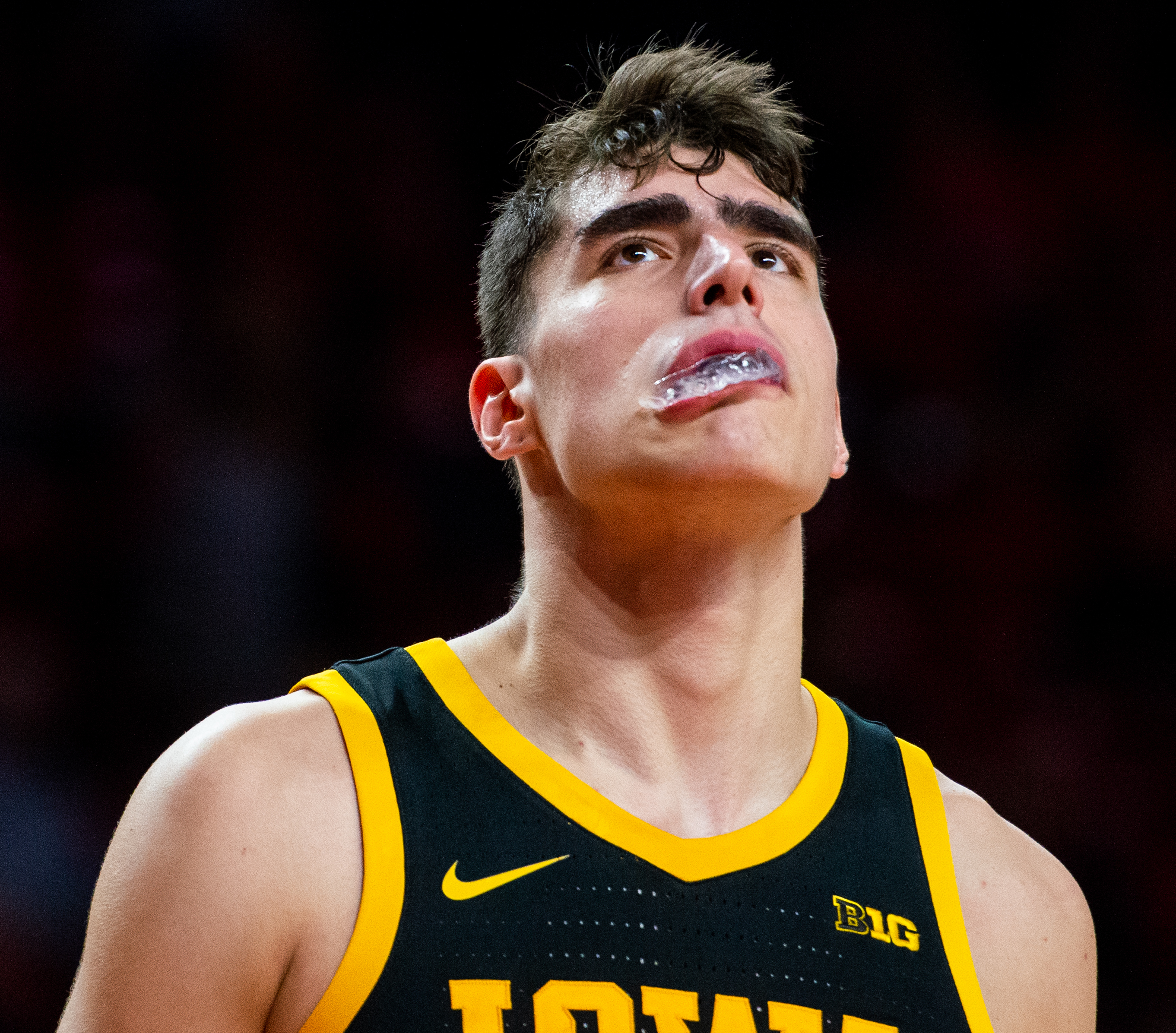
Luka Garza's #55, retired by Iowa in 2022

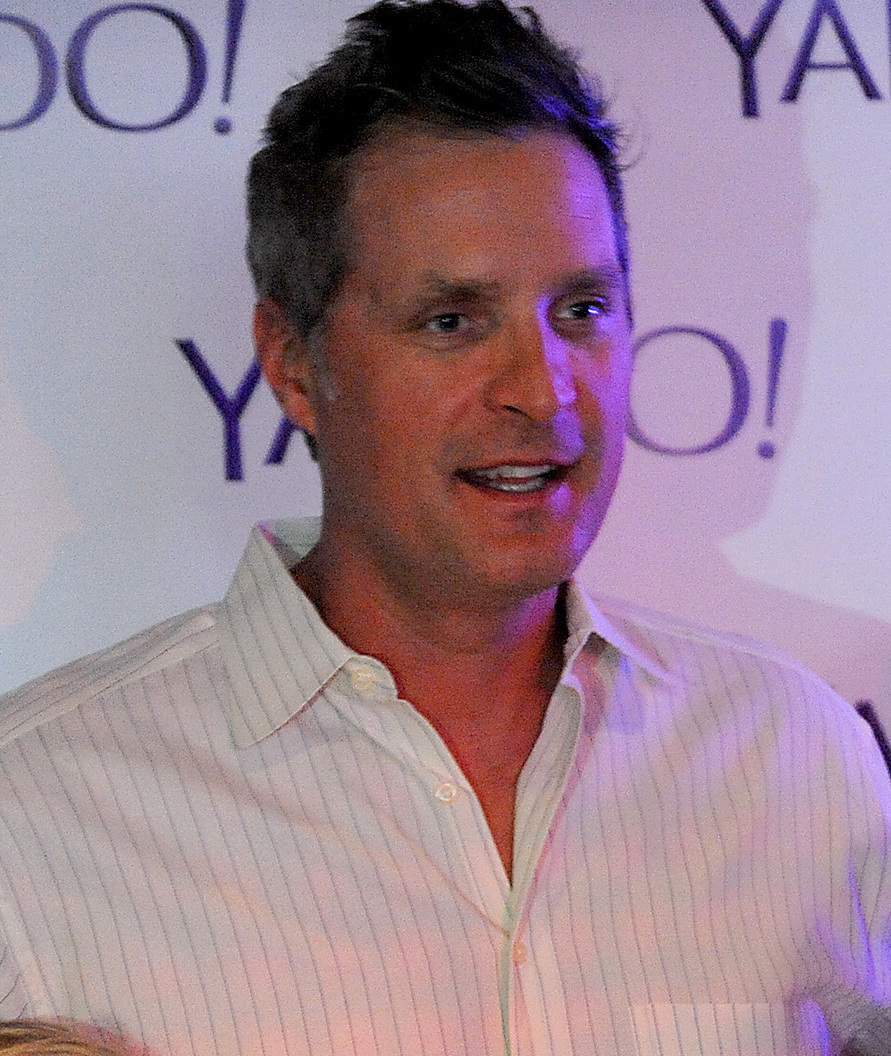
Christian Laettner's #32, retired by Duke

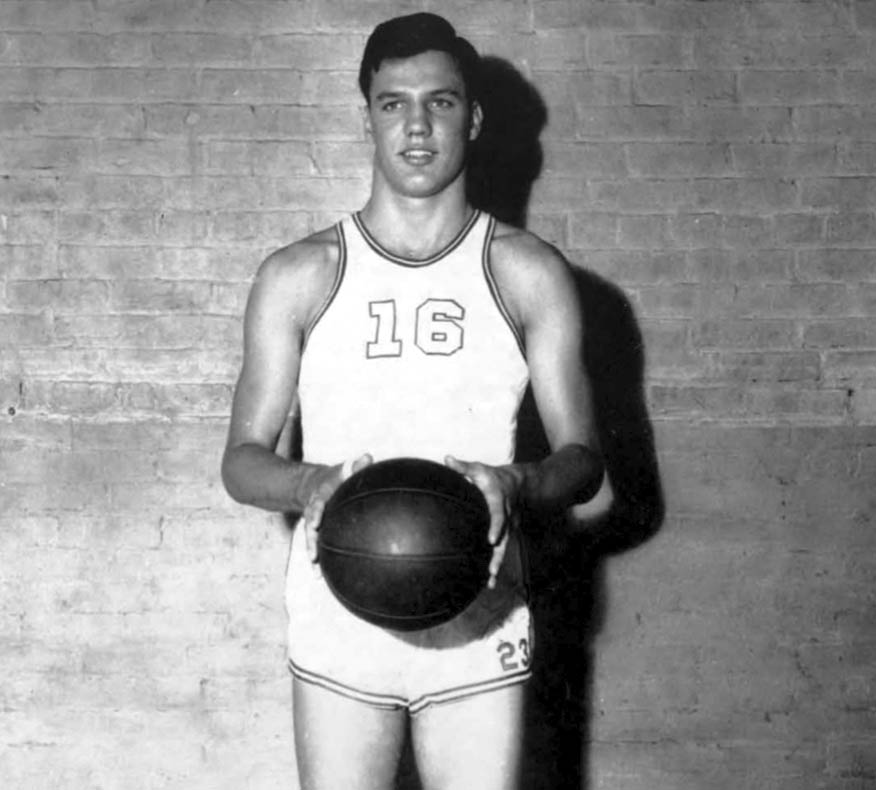
Bill Henry's #16, retired by Rice

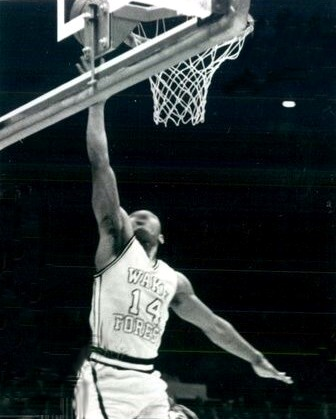
Tyrone Bogues' #14, retired by Wake Forest

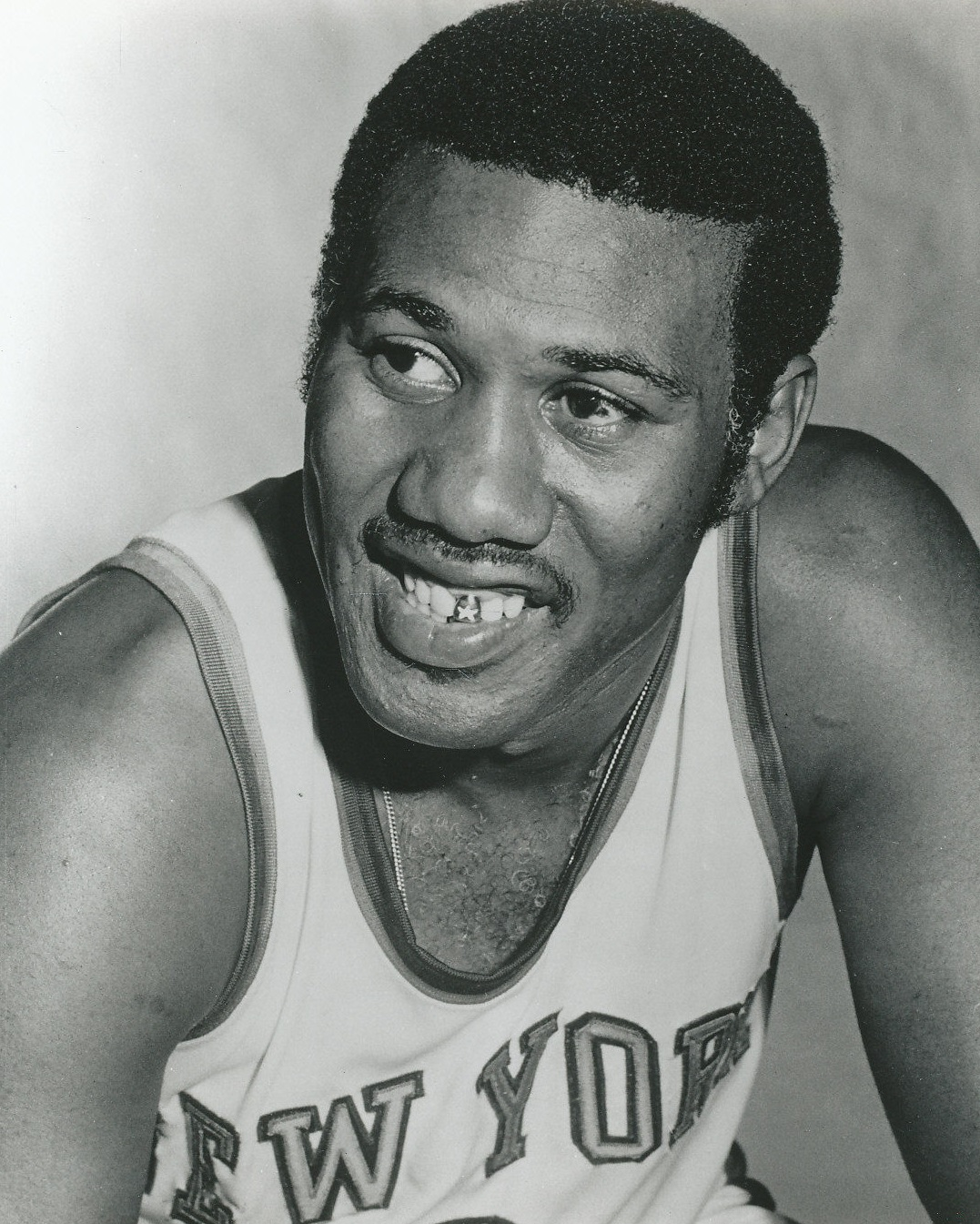
Dave Stallworth's #42, retired by Wichita State

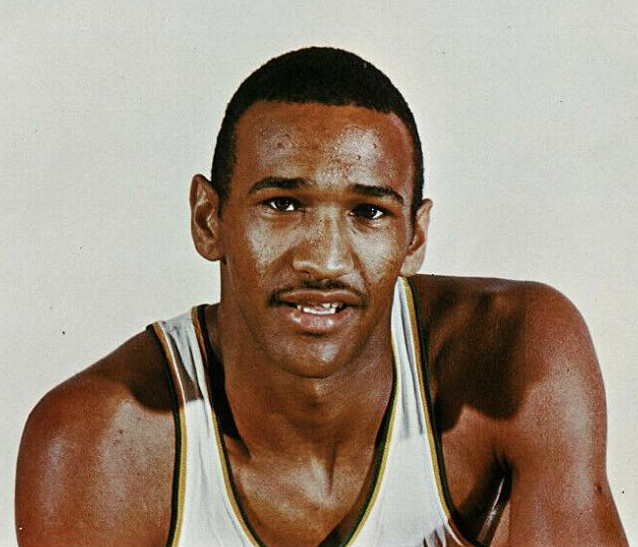
Stu Lantz' #22, retired by Nebraska

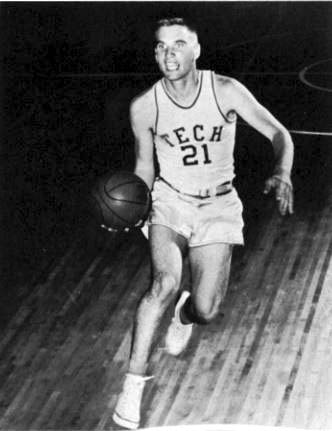
Roger Kaiser's #21, retired by Georgia Tech

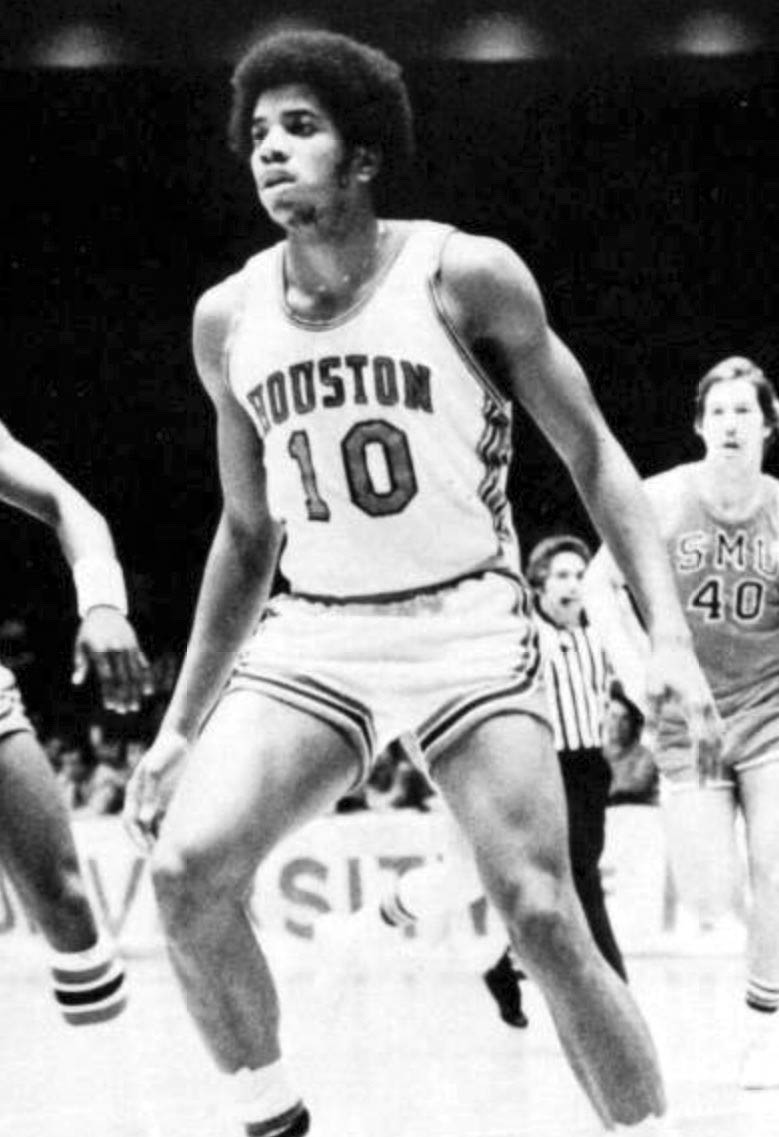
Otis Birdsong's #10, retired by Houston

University	No.	Player	Tenure	No. retired	Ref.
Alabama	20	Wendell Hudson	1969–1973	2020	
Albany	31	Jamar Wilson	2002–2007		
Arizona
Arizona	10	Mike Bibby	1996–1998	2004	
Arizona	22	Jason Gardner	1999–2003	2005	
Arizona	25	Steve Kerr	1983–1988	1999	
Arizona	31	Jason Terry	1995–1999	2015	
Arizona	32	Sean Elliott	1985–1989	1996	
Arizona	34	Miles Simon	1994–1998	2016	
Arizona State	13	James Harden (Note: In 2020, Harden gave Josh Christopher permission to wear his retired #13 number.)	2007–2009	2015	
Arkansas
Arkansas	32	Sidney Moncrief	1975–1979		
Arkansas	34	Corliss Williamson	1992–1995		
Army
Army	11	Kevin Houston	1983–1987	2015	
Army	20	Mike Silliman	1963–1966	2015	
Army	50	Gary Winton	1974–1978	2015	
Auburn
Auburn	11	Wesley Person	1990–1994	2006	
Auburn	15	John Mengelt	1968–1971	2001	
Auburn	30	Mike Mitchell	1974–1978	2013	
Auburn	32	Rex Frederick	1956–1959	2006	
Auburn	34	Charles Barkley (Note: Also member of a team inducted to the Hall of Fame as a unit.)	1981–1984	2001	
Auburn	45	Chuck Person	1982–1986	2006	
Austin Peay
Austin Peay	10	Tom Morgan	1974–1978	1999	
Austin Peay	13	Bubba Wells	1993–1997	1998	
Austin Peay	30	Howie Wright	1967–1970	1992	
Austin Peay	35	Fly Williams	1972–1974	2009	
Austin Peay	44	Trenton Hassell	1997–2001	2002	
Ball State
Ball State	10	Ray McCallum	1979–1983		
Ball State	42	Bonzi Wells	1994–1998		
Belmont
Belmont	15	Robert Barnes	1953–1956		
Belmont	54	Joe Behling	1986–1990		
Bucknell
Bucknell	22	Al Leslie	1977–1981		
Bucknell	31	Mike Muscala	2009–2013		
Bucknell	44	Hal Danzig	1956–1959		
Buffalo
Buffalo	11	Rasaun Young	1993–1998		
Buffalo	11	Turner Battle	2001–2005		
Buffalo	13	Jim Horne	1970–1973		
Buffalo	19	Harold Kuhn	1951–1955		
Buffalo	50	Sam Pellom	1949–1952		
Buffalo	52	Curtis Blackmore	1970–1973		
BYU
BYU	11	Krešimir Ćosić	1970–1973	2006	
BYU	11	Roland Minson	1948–1951	2013	
BYU	14	Mel Hutchins	1947–1951	2013	
BYU	22	Danny Ainge	1977–1981	2003	
BYU	32	Jimmer Fredette	2007–2011	2026	
California
California	4	Alfred Grigsby	1991–1997	1997	
California	5	Jason Kidd	1992–1994	2004	
California	11	Kevin Johnson	1983–1987	1992	
California	40	Darrall Imhoff	1957–1960	2009	
Cal Poly
Cal Poly	32	Hank Moroski	1947–1950	1993	
Cal Poly	40	Mike LaRoche	1965–1968	1993	
Cal State Fullerton
Cal State Fullerton	4	Rodney Anderson	1999–2000	2004	
Cal State Fullerton	20	Leon Wood	1981–1984		
Cal State Fullerton	30	Greg Bunch	1974–1978		
Central Arkansas	33	Scottie Pippen	1983–1987	2010	
Central Michigan
Central Michigan	14	Jim McElroy	1973–1975		
Central Michigan	14	Mel McLaughlin	1980–1983		
Central Michigan	30	Ben Kelso	1970–1973		
Central Michigan	32	Dan Roundfield	1972–1975		
Central Michigan	44	Dan Majerle	1984–1988		
Central Michigan	50	Ben Poquette	1973–1977		
Central Michigan	54	Don Edwards	1963–1966		
Charlotte
Charlotte	4	Byron Dinkins	1985–1989		
Charlotte	4	DeMarco Johnson	1994–1998		
Charlotte	13	Eddie Basden	2002–2005		
Charlotte	23	Jarvis Lang	1990–1991, 1992–1995		
Charlotte	32	Melvin Watkins	1973–1977		
Charlotte	33	Cedric Maxwell	1973–1977		
Charlotte	34	Henry Williams	1988–1992		
Charlotte	45	Charles Hayward	1997–1999		
Cincinnati
Cincinnati	4	Kenyon Martin	1996–2000		
Cincinnati	12	Oscar Robertson	1957–1960		
Cincinnati	27	Jack Twyman	1951–1955		
Clemson
Clemson	23	Banks McFadden	1937–1939	1987	
Clemson	30	Tree Rollins	1973–1977		
Clemson	34	Dale Davis	1987–1991		
Cleveland State
Cleveland State	10	Ken McFadden	1985–1989	1989	
Cleveland State	14	Franklin Edwards	1977–1981	1981	
Cleveland State	30	Norris Cole	2007–2011	2016	
Cleveland State	44	Clinton Ransey	1983–1987	2022	
Colorado
Colorado	20	Cliff Meely	1968–1971		
Colorado	22	Burdette Haldorson	1952–1955		
Colorado State	24	Bill Green	1960–1963	1988	
Creighton
Creighton	3	Doug McDermott	2010–2014	2023	
Creighton	25	Kyle Korver	1999–2003	2018	
Creighton	30	Bob Harstad	1987–1991		
Creighton	33	Bob Portman	1966–1969		
Creighton	35	Paul Silas	1961–1964		
Creighton	45	Bob Gibson	1954–1957		
Davidson	30	Stephen Curry	2006–2009	2022	
DePaul
DePaul	24	Mark Aguirre	1978–1981		
DePaul	99	George Mikan	1942–1946		
Detroit Mercy
Detroit Mercy	0	Antoine Davis	2018–2023	2023	
Detroit Mercy	3	Rashad Phillips	1997–2001	2020	
Detroit Mercy	17	Bob Calihan	1937–1940		
Detroit Mercy	22	Dave DeBusschere	1959–1962		
Detroit Mercy	24	Earl Cureton	1978–1980		
Detroit Mercy	32	Eli Holman	2009–2012	2020	
Detroit Mercy	34	Willie Green	1999–2003		
Detroit Mercy	42	Terry Duerod	1975–1979		
Detroit Mercy	44	Terry Tyler	1974–1978		
Detroit Mercy	45	Spencer Haywood	1968–1969		
Detroit Mercy	50	John Long	1974–1978		
Drake
Drake	5	Dolph Pulliam	1965–1969	2009	
Drake	15	Willie McCarter	1966–1969	2009	
Drake	30	Lewis Lloyd	1979–1981	1981	
Drake	33	Red Murrell	1955–1958	1958	
Drake	42	Willie Wise	1967–1969	2009	
Duke
Duke	4	JJ Redick	2002–2006	2007	
Duke	10	Dick Groat	1949–1952	1952	
Duke	11	Bobby Hurley	1989–1993	1993	
Duke	22	Jay Williams	1999–2002	2003	
Duke	23	Shelden Williams	2002–2006	2007	
Duke	24	Johnny Dawkins	1982–1986	1986	
Duke	25	Art Heyman	1960–1963	1990	
Duke	31	Shane Battier	1997–2001	2001	
Duke	32	Christian Laettner	1988–1992	1992	
Duke	33	Grant Hill	1990–1994	1994	
Duke	35	Danny Ferry	1985–1989	1989	
Duke	43	Mike Gminski	1976–1980	1980	
Duke	44	Jeff Mullins	1961–1964	1994	
Duquesne
Duquesne	10	Norm Nixon	1973–1977	2001	
Duquesne	11	Sihugo Green	1953–1956	2001	
Duquesne	12	Dick Ricketts	1951–1955	2001	
Duquesne	13	Mike James	1994–1998	2017	
Duquesne	15	Chuck Cooper	1946–1950	2001	
Duquesne	24	Willie Somerset	1961–1965	2001	
East Carolina	14	Sonny Russell	1949–1953	2000	
Florida	41	Neal Walk	1967–1969	1997	
Florida State
Florida State	12	Charlie Ward	1990-1994	2025	
Florida State	13	Dave Cowens	1968–1970		
Eastern Michigan
Eastern Michigan	11	Earl Boykins	1994–1998	2011	
Eastern Michigan	24	George Gervin	1971–1972		
Eastern Michigan	43	Grant Long	1985–1988		
Eastern Michigan	54	Kennedy McIntosh	1967–1971		
Fordham
Fordham	7	Bob Mullens	1941–1944	2019	
Fordham	11	Ed Conlin	1951–1955	2004	
Fordham	44	Ken Charles	1970–1973	2019	
Fresno State
Fresno State	2	Jerry Tarkanian (Note: Member of the Hall of Fame as a coach.)	1954–1955	2014	
Fresno State	24	Paul George	2008–2010	2019	
Georgia	21	Dominique Wilkins (Note: Wilkins allowed his son Jake, who entered Georgia as a freshman in 2025, to wear the number in the 2025–26 season. Jake would transfer to California after that season.)	1979–1982	1991	
Georgia Tech
Georgia Tech	4	Dennis Scott	1987–1990	2024	
Georgia Tech	15	Matt Harpring	1994–1998	1998	
Georgia Tech	20	Tom Hammonds	1985–1989		
Georgia Tech	21	Roger Kaiser	1958–1961	1961	
Georgia Tech	22	John Salley	1982–1986		
Georgia Tech	25	Mark Price	1982–1986		
Georgia Tech	40	Rich Yunkus	1968–1971	1971	
Gonzaga
Gonzaga	3	Adam Morrison	2003–2006	2020	
Gonzaga	12	John Stockton	1980–1984	2004	
Gonzaga	13	Kelly Olynyk	2009–2013	2022	
Gonzaga	21	Dan Dickau	2000–2002	2023	
Gonzaga	44	Frank Burgess	1958–1961	2005	
Hawaii
Hawaii	23	Anthony Carter	1996–1998	2026	
Hawaii	33	Bob Nash	1970–1972	2020	
Hofstra
Hofstra	10	Speedy Claxton	1996–2000		
Hofstra	13	Steve Nisenson	1962–1965		
Hofstra	21	Rich Laurel	1973–1977		
Hofstra	22	Charles Jenkins	2007–2011	2011	
Hofstra	93	Bill Thieben	1953–1956		
Houston
Houston	10	Otis Birdsong	1973–1977		
Houston	22	Clyde Drexler	1980–1983		
Houston	24	Don Chaney	1965–1968	2025	
Houston	34	Hakeem Olajuwon	1981–1984		
Houston	42	Dwight Davis	1969–1972	2026	
Houston	42	Michael Young	1980–1984	2007	
Houston	44	Elvin Hayes	1965–1968		
Indiana State
Indiana State	22	Carl Nicks	1976–1977, 1978–1980	2019	
Indiana State	33	Larry Bird	1976–1979	2004	
Indiana State	41	Jerry Newsom	1964–1968	2022	
Indiana State	44	John Sherman Williams	1982–1986	2024	
Indiana State	54	Duane Klueh	1945–1949	2004	
Iowa
Iowa	21	Carl Cain	1953–1956	1980	
Iowa	22	Bill Seaberg	1953–1956	1980	
Iowa	23	Roy Marble	1985–1989	2022	
Iowa	31	Bill Logan	1953–1956	1980	
Iowa	33	Bill Schoof	1953–1956	1980	
Iowa	40	Chris Street	1990–1993	1993	
Iowa	41	Greg Stokes	1981–1985	1985	
Iowa	46	Sharm Scheuerman	1953–1956	1980	
Iowa	55	Luka Garza	2017–2021	2021	
Iowa State
Iowa State	14	Jeff Hornacek	1982–1986	1991	
Iowa State	14	Waldo Wegner	1932–1935	1992	
Iowa State	20	Gary Thompson	1954–1957	1957	
Iowa State	32	Fred Hoiberg	1991–1995	1997	
Iowa State	35	Zaid Abdul-Aziz	1965–1968	1968	
Iowa State	35	Barry Stevens	1981–1985	2008	
Iowa State	44	Jeff Grayer	1984–1988	1988	
Kent State
Kent State	10	Demetric Shaw	1999–2002		
Kent State	12	Andrew Mitchell	1998–2002		
Kent State	24	Trevor Huffman	1998–2002		
Kent State	40	Eric Thomas	1998–2002		
Kent State	44	Antonio Gates	2001–2003		
La Salle
La Salle	15	Tom Gola	1951–1955		
La Salle	22	Lionel Simmons	1986–1990		
La Salle	20	Larry Cannon	1966–1969		
La Salle	32	Michael Brooks	1976–1980		
La Salle	33	Ken Durrett	1968–1971		
Long Beach State
Long Beach State	20	Glenn McDonald	1971–1974	2018	
Long Beach State	30	Lucious Harris	1989–1993	2007	
Long Beach State	32	Bryon Russell	1990–1993	2010	
Long Beach State	42	Ed Ratleff	1970–1973	1991	
Louisiana Tech
Louisiana Tech	12	Leon Barmore	1965–1967		
Louisiana Tech	32	Karl Malone	1982–1985		
Louisiana Tech	44	Jackie Moreland	1957–1960		
Louisville
Louisville	2	Russ Smith	2010–2014	2022	
Louisville	8	Charlie Tyra	1954–1957		
Louisville	31	Wes Unseld	1966–1968		
Louisville	35	Darrell Griffith	1977–1980		
Louisville	42	Pervis Ellison	1986–1989		
Loyola Chicago
Loyola Chicago	3	Nick Kladis	1949–1952		
Loyola Chicago	11	John Egan	1961–1964		
Loyola Chicago	15	Jerry Harkness	1960–1963		
Loyola Chicago	20	LaRue Martin	1969–1972	2002	
Loyola Chicago	21	Alfredrick Hughes	1981–1985		
Loyola Chicago	40	Vic Rouse	1961–1964		
Loyola Chicago	41	Les Hunter	1961–1964		
Loyola Chicago	42	Ron Miller	1961–1964		
Loyola Marymount
Loyola Marymount	30	Bo Kimble	1987–1990	2000	
Loyola Marymount	44	Hank Gathers (Note: Posthumously retired after Gathers collapsed and died during a game at age 23.)	1987–1990	2000	
LSU
LSU	23	Pete Maravich	1967–1970	2007	
LSU	33	Shaquille O'Neal	1989–1992	2000	
LSU	35	Mahmoud Abdul-Rauf	1988–1990	2020	
LSU	40	Rudy Macklin	1976–1981	2009	
LSU	50	Bob Pettit	1950–1954	1954	
Marist
Marist	3	Drafton Davis	1984–1988		
Marist	12	Steve Smith	1979–1983		
Marist	45	Rik Smits	1984–1988		
Marquette
Marquette	3	Dwyane Wade	2001–2003		
Marquette	14	Dean Meminger	1968–1971		
Marquette	15	Butch Lee	1974–1978		
Marquette	20	Maurice Lucas	1972–1974		
Marquette	24	George Thompson	1966–1969		
Marquette	31	Bo Ellis	1973–1977		
Marquette	31	Doc Rivers	1980–1983		
Marquette	38	Bob Weingart (Note: Not a player but an athletic trainer. Number "38" honors the number of years he spent with the program.)	1946–1984		
Marquette	43	Earl Tatum	1972–1976		
Marquette	44	Don Kojis	1958–1961		
Marquette	77	Al McGuire (Note: The "77" honors the year Marquette won their first national championship (1977), led by McGuire.)	1964–1977		
Marshall
Marshall	10	Mike D'Antoni	1970–1973		
Marshall	16	Hal Greer	1955–1958		
Marshall	17	Charlie Slack	1952–1956		
Marshall	20	Walt Walowac	1950–1954		
Marshall	22	John Taft	1988–1991		
Marshall	44	Leo Byrd	1956–1959		
Marshall	55	Russ Lee	1969–1972		
Memphis
Memphis	13	Forest Arnold	1952–1956		
Memphis	21	Larry Finch	1970–1973		
Memphis	22	Win Wilfong	1955–1957		
Memphis	24	Keith Lee	1981–1985		
Memphis	25	Penny Hardaway (Note: Jayden Hardaway, guard/forward from 2018 to present and son of head coach Penny Hardaway, has worn his father's #25 in his Redshirt, Freshman and Junior seasons (he wore #1 in his Sophomore season).)	1991–1993		
Memphis	33	Ronnie Robinson	1970–1973		
Memphis	34	Elliot Perry	1987–1991		
Memphis	35	Larry Kenon	1972–1973		
Memphis	44	John Gunn (Note: John Gunn succumbed to Stevens–Johnson syndrome on December 21, 1976. He had been diagnosed with the rare disease only three games into the 1976 season.)	1974–1976		
Miami (Florida)
Miami (Florida)	24	Rick Barry	1962–1965	1976	
Miami (Florida)	40	Tim James	1995–1999	1999	
Miami (Ohio)
Miami (Ohio)	10	Charlie Coles	1963–1965	2015	
Miami (Ohio)	23	Wayne Embry (Note: Member of the Hall of Fame as a contributor.)	1956–1958	1995	
Miami (Ohio)	32	Wally Szczerbiak	1995–1999	2001	
Miami (Ohio)	34	Ron Harper	1982–1986	1986	
Miami (Ohio)	44	Dick Walls	1951–1953	1995	
Miami (Ohio)	86	Darrell Hedric	1952–1955	1997	
Michigan	33	Cazzie Russell	1963–1966	1993	
Michigan State
Michigan State	4	Scott Skiles	1982–1986	1998	
Michigan State	12	Mateen Cleaves	1996–2000	2007	
Michigan State	21	Steve Smith	1987–1991	1999	
Michigan State	23	Draymond Green	2008–2012	2019	
Michigan State	24	Johnny Green	1955–1958		
Michigan State	24	Shawn Respert	1991–1995	1998	
Michigan State	31	Jay Vincent	1978–1981	1999	
Michigan State	32	Greg Kelser	1976–1979		
Michigan State	33	Magic Johnson	1977–1979		
Michigan State	42	Morris Peterson	1995–2000	2009	
Mississippi State	52	Bailey Howell	1957–1959	2009	
Missouri
Missouri	3	Derrick Chievous	1984–1988	2019	
Missouri	20	Jon Sundvold	1979–1983		
Missouri	22	Norm Stewart	1953–1956		
Missouri	30	Willie Smith	1974–1976		
Missouri	34	Doug Smith	1987–1991		
Missouri	40	Steve Stipanovich	1979–1983		
Missouri	43	Bill Stauffer	1949–1952		
Missouri	50	John Brown	1970–1973	2019	
Missouri State
Missouri State	22	Winston Garland	1985–1987		
Missouri State	32	Danny Moore	1996–1999	2023	
Missouri State	32	Daryel Garrison (Note: Bears all-time leading scorer with 1,975 points.)	1971–1975	2008	
Missouri State	43	Jerry Anderson	1951–1955		
Missouri State	54	Curtis Perry	1966–1970		
Murray State
Murray State	1	Cameron Payne	2013–2015	2023	
Murray State	3	Isaiah Canaan	2009–2013	2018	
Murray State	5	Marcus Brown	1992–1996	2010	
Murray State	10	Lamont Sleets	1979-1984	2025	
Murray State	12	Ja Morant	2017–2019	2020	
Murray State	15	Jeff Martin	1985–1989	1989	
Murray State	16	Garrett Beshear	1950–1953	1953	
Murray State	19	Howie Crittenden	1952–1956	1956	
Murray State	20	Johnny Reagan	1945–1948	2003	
Murray State	21	Bennie Purcell	1949–1952	1952	
Murray State	26	Joe Fulks	1941–1943	2001	
Murray State	30	Paul King	1987–1991	1991	
Murray State	31	Isaac Spencer	1997-2001	2025	
Murray State	40	Stew Johnson	1963–1966	2023	
Murray State	54	Popeye Jones	1988–1992	1992	
NC State	44	David Thompson	1972–1975		
Nebraska
Nebraska	10	Tyronn Lue	1995–1998	2017	
Nebraska	22	Stu Lantz	1965–1968	1989	
Nebraska	42	Dave Hoppen	1982–1986	1986	
Nebraska	52	Eric Piatkowski	1990–1994	2006	
Nevada
Nevada	22	Nick Fazekas	2003–2007	2019	
Nevada	32	Edgar Jones	1975–1979	1979	
New Orleans	40	Ervin Johnson	1989–1993	1997	
North Carolina	10	Lennie Rosenbluth	1954–1957		
North Carolina	12	Phil Ford	1974–1978		
North Carolina	20	George Glamack	1938–1941		
North Carolina	23	Michael Jordan	1981–1984		
North Carolina	33	Antawn Jamison	1995–1998		
North Carolina	50	Tyler Hansbrough	2005–2009		
North Carolina	52	James Worthy	1979–1982		
Ohio State
Ohio State	5	John Havlicek	1959–1962		
Ohio State	11	Jerry Lucas	1959–1962		
Ohio State	21	Evan Turner	2007–2010		
Ohio State	22	Jim Jackson	1989–1992		
Ohio State	35	Gary Bradds	1961–1964		
Old Dominion
Old Dominion	5	Leo Anthony	1958–1961	1961	
Old Dominion	14	Dave Twardzik	1969–1972	1972	
Old Dominion	24	Kent Bazemore	2008–2012	2016	
Old Dominion	32	Joel Copeland	1970–1974	1974	
Old Dominion	33	Odell Hodge	1992–1997	2010	
Old Dominion	44	Kenny Gattison	1982–1986	1992	
Old Dominion	45	Mark West	1979–1983	1984	
Old Dominion	52	Wilson Washington	1974–1977	1978	
Oral Roberts
Oral Roberts	15	Anthony Roberts	1973–1977		
Oral Roberts	24	Rich Fuqua	1969–1973		
Oral Roberts	42	Mark Acres	1981–1985		
Oregon State
Oregon State	20	Gary Payton	1986–1990	1996	
Oregon State	21	Mel Counts	1961–1964	1996	
Oregon State	25	Ed Lewis	1931–1933		
Oregon State	33	Steve Johnson	1976–1981	1996	
Oregon State	45	A.C. Green	1981–1985	1996	
Pacific
Pacific	5	Dell Demps	1988–1992	2019	
Pacific	23	John Gianelli	1969–1972	1973	
Pacific	32	Keith Swagerty	1964–1967	1967	
Pacific	44	Ron Cornelius	1977–1981	1982	
Pacific	55	Michael Olowokandi	1995–1998	1998	
Pittsburgh
Pittsburgh	10	Don Hennon	1956–1959	1968	
Pittsburgh	15	Sam Clancy	1977–1981	2025	
Pittsburgh	20	Brandin Knight	1999–2003	2009	
Pittsburgh	32	Charles Smith	1984–1988	1988	
Pittsburgh	34	Billy Knight	1971–1974	1989	
Rice
Rice	16	Bill Henry	1942–1945		
Rice	21	Gene Schwinger	1951–1954		
Rice	22	Bill Closs	1939–1943		
Rice	23	Bob Kinney	1938–1942		
Rice	25	Ricky Pierce	1979–1982		
Rice	29	Don Lance	1951–1954		
Richmond
Richmond	14	Kevin Anderson	2007–2011		
Richmond	20	Johnny Newman	1982–1986		
Richmond	23	Warren Mills	1952–1955		
Rider
Rider	1	Jason Thompson	2004–2008	2009	
Rider	4	Darrick Suber	1989–1993		
San Diego State	15	Kawhi Leonard	2009–2011	2020	
San Francisco
San Francisco	4	K. C. Jones	1952–1956		
San Francisco	6	Bill Russell (Note: Also member of the Hall of Fame as a coach.)	1953–1956		
San Francisco	17	Mike Farmer	1955–1958		
San Francisco	20	Phil Smith	1971–1974		
San Francisco	24	Bill Cartwright	1975–1979		
San Francisco	31	Joe Ellis	1963–1966		
San Francisco	32	Ollie Johnson	1962–1965		
St. Bonaventure
St. Bonaventure	13	Ken Murray	1946–1950	1969	
St. Bonaventure	14	Bill Butler	1964–1968	1969	
St. Bonaventure	22	Sam Stith	1957–1960	1969	
St. Bonaventure	25	Earl Belcher	1977–1981	1991	
St. Bonaventure	25	Essie Hollis	1973–1977	1988	
St. Bonaventure	31	Bob Lanier	1967–1970	1975	
St. Bonaventure	34	Roland Martin	1958–1961	1969	
St. Bonaventure	42	Tom Stith	1958–1961	1969	
St. Bonaventure	44	Andrew Nicholson	2008–2012	2014	
St. Bonaventure	53	Greg Sanders	1974–1978	2016	
St. Bonaventure	54	Freddie Crawford	1960–1964	1970	
Saint Joseph's
Saint Joseph's	4	George Senesky	1939–1943		
Saint Joseph's	4	Paul Senesky	1947–1950		
Saint Joseph's	4	Jim Lynam	1960–1963		
Saint Joseph's	4	Billy Oakes	1963–1966		
Saint Joseph's	14	Jameer Nelson	2000–2004		
Saint Joseph's	30	Cliff Anderson	1964–1967		
Saint Joseph's	44	Mike Bantom	1970–1973		
Saint Louis	50	Ed Macauley	1945–1949		
Saint Mary's
Saint Mary's	4	Matthew Dellavedova	2009–2013	2014	
Saint Mary's	13	Patty Mills	2007–2009	2015	
Saint Mary's	31	Tom Meschery	1958–1961		
Santa Clara
Santa Clara	5	Bob Feerick	1938–1941	2007	
Santa Clara	11	Steve Nash	1992–1996	2006	
Santa Clara	24	Dennis Awtrey	1967–1970	2007	
Santa Clara	32	Nick Vanos	1981–1985	2007	
Santa Clara	34	Kurt Rambis	1976–1980	2007	
Santa Clara	34	Bud Ogden	1966–1969	2007	
Santa Clara	55	Ken Sears	1950–1954	2007	
Siena
Siena	4	Marc Brown	1987–1991	2010	
Siena	10	Billy Harrell (Note: He was also a notable baseball player for Siena.)	1949–1952		
Siena	41	Kenny Hasbrouck	2005–2009		
Siena	50	Fred Shear	1969–1973	2012	
South Carolina
South Carolina	3	BJ McKie	1995–1999		
South Carolina	11	John Roche	1968–1971		
South Carolina	22	Alex English	1972–1976		
South Carolina	42	Grady Wallace	1955–1957		
South Carolina	43	Kevin Joyce	1970–1973		
South Florida
South Florida	12	Chucky Atkins	1992–1996		
South Florida	30	Charlie Bradley	1981–1985		
South Florida	31	Radenko Dobraš	1988–1992		
Southern Illinois
Southern Illinois	20	Chico Vaughn	1958–1962		
Southern Illinois	52	Walt Frazier	1963–1967		
TCU
TCU	24	Darrell Browder	1979–1983		
TCU	28	Dick O'Neal	1954–1957		
TCU	34	Kenrich Williams	2014–2018	2024	
TCU	40	Kurt Thomas	1990–1995	2017	
TCU	54	James Cash Jr. (Note: Cash was the first black student/athlete at TCU and the first black basketball player in the Southwest Conference.)	1966–1969		
Temple
Temple	5	Guy Rodgers	1955–1958		
Temple	6	Hal Lear	1953–1956	2012	
Temple	12	Mark Macon	1987–1991		
Temple	20	Bill Mlkvy	1949–1952		
Tennessee
Tennessee	5	Chris Lofton	2004–2008	2023	
Tennessee	14	Dale Ellis	1979–1983		
Tennessee	20	Allan Houston	1989–1993		
Tennessee	22	Ernie Grunfeld	1973–1977		
Tennessee	53	Bernard King	1974–1977		
Texas
Texas	11	T. J. Ford	2001–2003	2004	
Texas	15	Slater Martin	1943–1944, 1946–1949	2009	
Texas	35	Kevin Durant	2006–2007	2009	
Tulsa
Tulsa	12	Willie Biles	1971–1974	2010	
Tulsa	20	Steve Harris	1981–1985		
Tulsa	21	Shea Seals	1993–1997	1997	
Tulsa	24	Jim King	1960–1963	2000	
Tulsa	25	Paul Pressey	1980–1982		
Tulsa	30	Bob Patterson	1951–1955		
Tulsa	32	Bingo Smith	1966–1969	2020	
UAB
UAB	1	Aaron Johnson	2007–2011	2020	
UAB	14	Steve Mitchell	1982–1986		
UAB	20	Oliver Robinson	1978–1982		
UAB	40	Jerome Mincy	1982–1986		
UC Irvine
UC Irvine	12	Scott Brooks	1985–1987	2019	
UC Irvine	44	Kevin Magee	1980–1982	1995	
UC Santa Barbara	22	Brian Shaw	1986–1988		
UCF	23	Bo Clark	1975–1980	1980	
UCLA
UCLA	11	Don Barksdale	1946–1947	2013	
UCLA	25	Gail Goodrich	1962–1965	2004	
UCLA	31	Ed O'Bannon	1991–1995	1996	
UCLA	31	Reggie Miller	1983–1987	2013	
UCLA	32	Bill Walton	1971–1974	1990	
UCLA	33	Kareem Abdul-Jabbar	1966–1969	1990	
UCLA	35	Sidney Wicks	1968–1971	1996	
UCLA	42	Walt Hazzard	1961–1964	1996	
UCLA	42	Jackie Robinson (Note: Robinson never wore the number 42 in any of the three team sports he played while at UCLA—baseball, basketball, or football. UCLA chose to retire #42 across all of its sports (adding him as a second honored #42 in men's basketball) because of the number's indelible identification with Robinson, that having been the number he wore during his Hall of Fame baseball career with the Brooklyn Dodgers.)	1940–1941	2014	
UCLA	52	Jamaal Wilkes	1971–1974	2013	
UCLA	54	Marques Johnson	1973–1977		
UConn	32	Richard Hamilton	1996–1999	2024	
UConn	34	Ray Allen	1993–1996	2019	
UConn	50	Emeka Okafor	2001–2004	2026	
UMass
UMass	15	Lou Roe	1991–1995		
UMass	21	Marcus Camby	1993–1996	2013	
UMass	30	Al Skinner	1971–1974		
UMass	32	George Burke	1954–1956		
UMass	32	Julius Erving	1968–1971		
UNC Greensboro
UNC Greensboro	5	Scott Hartzell	1992–1997		
UNC Greensboro	23	Courtney Eldridge	1998–2002		
UNC Greensboro	42	Kyle Hines	2004–2008		
USC	10	Gus Williams	1972–1975	2016	
USC	10	DeMar DeRozan	2008–2009	2020	
USC	11	Bill Sharman	1946–1950	2007	
USC	19	Bob Boyd	1950–1952	2017	
USC	23	Harold Miner	1989–1992	2012	
USC	25	Paul Westphal	1969–1972	2007	
USC	44	John Rudometkin	1959–1962	2010	
Utah
Utah	4	Andrew Bogut	2003–2005		
Utah	12	Billy McGill	1959–1962		
Utah	22	Arnie Ferrin	1943–1948		
Utah	23	Danny Vranes	1977–1981		
Utah	24	Andre Miller	1995–1999		
Utah	33	Vern Gardner	1945–1949		
Utah	44	Keith Van Horn	1993–1997		
UTEP
UTEP	10	Tim Hardaway	1985–1989		
UTEP	14	Bobby Joe Hill	1961–1966		
UTEP	14	Nate Archibald	1967–1970		
UTEP	42	Nolan Richardson	1961–1964	2011	
UTEP	43	David Lattin	1965–1967		
UTEP	44	Harry Flournoy	1963–1966		
UTEP	45	Jim Barnes	1962–1964		
Valparaiso
Valparaiso	24	Bryce Drew	1994–1998	2014	
Valparaiso	24	Bruce Lindner	1967–1970	2014	
Vanderbilt
Vanderbilt	25	Perry Wallace	1967–1970	2004	
Vanderbilt	32	Shan Foster	2004–2008	2022	
Vanderbilt	33	Clyde Lee	1964–1966		
Vermont
Vermont	10	Eddie Benton	1992–1996	2000	
Vermont	11	T. J. Sorrentine	2000–2005	2019	
Vermont	22	Taylor Coppenrath	2001–2005	2019	
Vermont	33	Kevin Roberson	1988–1992	1992	
Vermont	45	Trevor Gaines (Note: Posthumously retired. He died on July 21, 2010 at the age of 29 after he collapsed playing pick-up basketball.)	1998–2002	2011	
Villanova	11	Paul Arizin	1947–1950		
Virginia
Virginia	3	Jeff Lamp	1977–1981		
Virginia	14	Buzzy Wilkinson	1951–1954		
Virginia	15	Malcolm Brogdon	2011–2016		
Virginia	20	Bryant Stith	1988–1992		
Virginia	40	Barry Parkhill	1969–1973		
Virginia	41	Wally Walker	1972–1976		
Virginia	44	Sean Singletary	2004–2008		
Virginia	50	Ralph Sampson	1979–1983		
Virginia Tech
Virginia Tech	12	Bimbo Coles	1986–1990	1990	
Virginia Tech	20	Ace Custis	1993–1997	1997	
Virginia Tech	30	Dell Curry	1982–1986	1986	
Virginia Tech	44	Allan Bristow	1970–1973	1998	
Wake Forest
Wake Forest	3	Chris Paul	2003–2005	2013	
Wake Forest	5	Josh Howard	1999–2003		
Wake Forest	12	Charlie Davis	1968–1971		
Wake Forest	14	Muggsy Bogues	1983–1987		
Wake Forest	15	Skip Brown	1973–1977		
Wake Forest	21	Tim Duncan	1993–1997		
Wake Forest	22	Randolph Childress	1991–1995		
Wake Forest	24	Dickie Hemric	1951–1955		
Wake Forest	32	Rod Griffin	1974–1978		
Wake Forest	50	Len Chappell	1959–1962		
Wake Forest	54	Rodney Rogers	1990–1993		
Washington
Washington	2	Isaiah Thomas	2008–2011	2018	
Washington	3	Brandon Roy	2002–2006	2009	
Washington	25	Bob Houbregs	1950–1953		
Washington State
Washington State	1	Klay Thompson	2008–2011	2020	
Washington State	55	Steve Puidokas	1973–1977		
West Virginia
West Virginia	33	Hot Rod Hundley	1954–1957	2010	
West Virginia	44	Jerry West (Note: Also member of a team inducted to the Hall of Fame as a unit, and a Hall of Fame member as a contributor.)	1957–1960	2005	
West Virginia	44	Rod Thorn	1960–1963	2020	
Wichita State
Wichita State	13	Cleo Littleton	1952–1955		
Wichita State	34	Xavier McDaniel	1981–1985		
Wichita State	35	Antoine Carr	1979–1983		
Wichita State	42	Dave Stallworth	1961–1965	1974	
Wichita State	54	Cliff Levingston	1979–1983		
Wisconsin
Wisconsin	8	Ab Nicholas	1949–1952	2017	
Wisconsin	24	Michael Finley	1991–1995	2022	
Wisconsin	44	Frank Kaminsky	2011–2015	2018	
Wright State	42	Bill Edwards	1989–1993		
Wyoming
Wyoming	4	Ken Sailors	1940–1946	2008	
Wyoming	34	Fennis Dembo	1984–1988	2019	
Xavier
Xavier	5	Trevon Bluiett	2014–2018	2024	
Xavier	10	Romain Sato	2001–2004	2024	
Xavier	23	Byron Larkin	1984–1988	1997	
Xavier	30	David West	1999–2003	2003	
Xavier	33	Brian Grant	1990–1994	2011	
Xavier	42	Tyrone Hill	1986–1990	1997	
Xavier	52	Tu Holloway	2008–2012	2024	
