= Ron Cornelius (basketball) =

American basketball player

Personal information
- Born: December 11, 1958 (age 67) Santa Ana, California, U.S.
- Listed height: 6 ft 8 in (2.03 m)
- Listed weight: 195 lb (88 kg)

Career information
- High school: Valley (Santa Ana, California)
- College: Pacific (1977–1981)
- NBA draft: 1981: 3rd round, 65th overall pick
- Drafted by: Los Angeles Lakers
- Playing career: 1981–1989
- Position: Power forward / center
- Number: 8, 15

Career history
- 1981–1982: Sunderland Saints
- 1984: Granollers
- 1985–1986: Unione Sportiva Sangiorgese
- 1985–1986: Gijón Baloncesto
- 1987–1988: Le Mans
- 1988–1989: Sceaux

Career highlights
- PCAA Player of the Year (1979); 3× First-team All-PCAA (1979–1981); PCAA tournament MOP (1979); No. 44 retired by Pacific Tigers
- Stats at Basketball Reference

Ronald Morgan Cornelius (born December 11, 1958) is an American former basketball player. He played professionally in Spain, Italy, France and the United Kingdom and played college basketball for the Pacific Tigers.

A Santa Ana, California native, Cornelius starred at Valley High School where, in his senior season, he averaged 22 points per game, 15 rebounds per game and shot 63% from the field. At the close of the season, he was named the Orange County prep player of the year. Following his high school career, he committed to coach Stan Morrison at the University of the Pacific of the Pacific Coast Athletic Association (PCAA, now known as the Big West Conference), selecting the Tigers over schools such as Louisville, USC and Cal State Fullerton.

Despite weighing only 183 pounds (at 6 feet, 8 inches tall) upon enrollment, Cornelius proved to be an immediate impact player for the Tigers. He became a starter from his first game and finished the season averaging 12.3 points and 8.1 rebounds per game. In his second season, Cornelius raised his averages to 15.3 points and 9.4 rebounds per game, leading the Tigers to both the PCAA regular season and tournament championships. At the close of his sophomore season, Cornelius was named the PCAA Player of the Year and first-team all-conference. In the 1979 PCAA tournament, Cornelius recorded 21 points and 10 rebounds in the tournament final win over Utah State. He was named tournament most outstanding player, and secured the Tigers' first NCAA tournament berth since 1971.

Following his sophomore season, coach Morrison left Pacific to take the head coaching job at USC and was replaced by Dick Fichtner. The Tigers' team performance slipped, but Cornelius continued to be highly productive, ultimately finishing with career averages of 18.1 points and 8.5 rebounds per game. Cornelius finished his career as the leading scorer in school and conference history (2,065 points), as well as the PCAA all-time leader in rebounds with 973 (conference records since eclipsed).

After the close of his college career, Cornelius was drafted by the Los Angeles Lakers in the third round (65th pick overall) of the 1981 NBA draft. After not making the team, he spent the rest of his career playing in various leagues in Europe for about ten years. He then moved into the business world as an IT consultant and coached high school basketball on the side.
