= Valley High School (Santa Ana, California) =

Santa Ana Valley High School
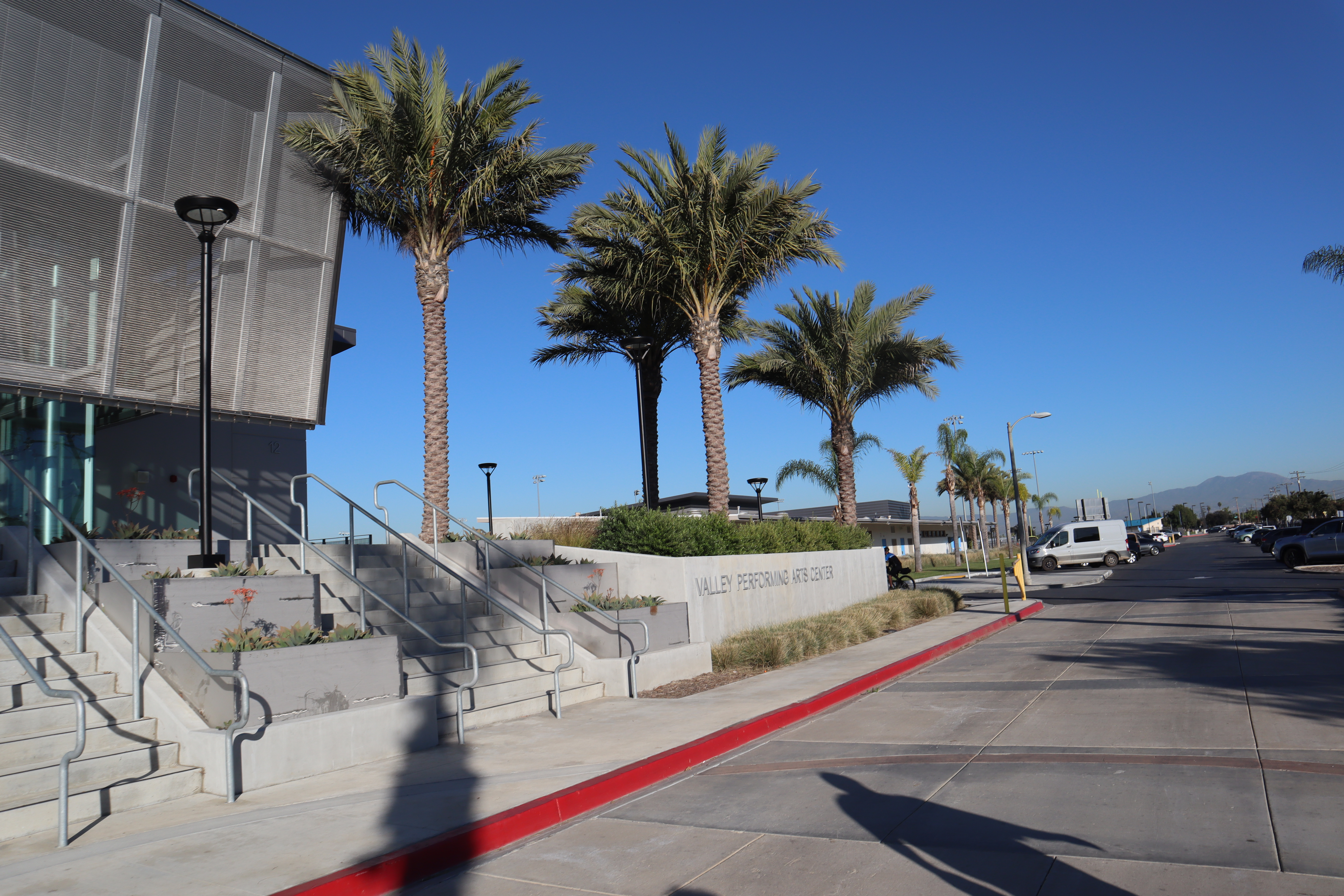
- Photograph of the front of the Santa Ana Valley High School Performing Arts Center.

Location
- 1801 S Greenville Street; Santa Ana, California 92704; United States; 33.723°N 117.890°W

Information
- Type: Public
- Motto: "Falcon Fever Catch It!"
- Established: 1959; 67 years ago
- School district: Santa Ana Unified School District
- Principal: Katherine Berger
- Teaching staff: 104.75 (FTE)
- Grades: 9–12
- Enrollment: 2,077 (2023–2024)
- Student to teacher ratio: 19.83
- Colors: Azure blue & sunset gold
- Mascot: Falcons
- Accreditation: WASC
- Yearbook: Talon
- Website: valley.sausd.us

Santa Ana Valley High School, also referred to as Valley High School, is located in Santa Ana, California, United States. Valley High was built in 1959.

== Background ==
Santa Ana Valley High School was the second high school constructed for the Santa Ana Unified School District. The school first opened its doors on September 14, 1959.

In 2006–07, the school was remodeled for the first time in its history. During this time, all students used the Godinez Fundamental High School campus, which had just been built. The nickname "Valley West" was first used by Lewis Bratcher to note the temporary three-block westward move. This remodeling project included the construction of a brand new Olympic-size swimming pool and the installation of air conditioning in some of the classrooms.

== Notable alumni ==
- Ed Caruthers, 1968 Olympic silver medalist, high jump
- Ron Cornelius, basketball player
- Melvin Lee Davis, bass player, music director
- Karl Denson, saxophonist
- Don Hồ, Vietnamese-American pop singer
- Garry Templeton, St. Louis Cardinals, MLB
- Rick Walker, Washington Redskins, NFL
- Myron White, Los Angeles Dodgers, MLB, Orange County leading rusher
- Gerald Young, Houston Astros, MLB
