= Dick Fichtner =

American basketball coach (1939–2018)

Biographical details
- Born: September 16, 1939
- Died: April 17, 2018 (aged 78)

Playing career
- 1958–1960: West Hills
- 1960–1962: UC Santa Barbara

Coaching career (HC unless noted)
- 1964–1970: Occidental (assistant)
- 1970–1973: Occidental
- 1973–1979: Pacific (CA) (assistant)
- 1979–1982: Pacific (CA)

Richard Allen Fichtner (September 16, 1939 – April 17, 2018) was an American college basketball coach.

Fichtner came from Batesville, Indiana, and played four varsity sports at West Hills College Coalinga, then finished his college career playing baseball at UC Santa Barbara.

In 1964, Fichtner became an assistant basketball coach for Occidental College. He was named head coach at Occidental in 1970. He led the Tigers for three seasons, compiling a 47–31 record. He left Occidental to become an assistant coach at Division I Pacific under head coach Stan Morrison in 1973, and in 1979 became head coach when Morrison left to take the coaching job at USC. He resigned from Pacific after compiling a 36–49 record over three seasons.

Fichtner died on April 17, 2018, after a battle with bone cancer and Alzheimer's disease.
