= 1979 NCAA Division I basketball championship game =

Men's college basketball tournament game

1979 NCAA Tournament Championship Game
National championship game
Michigan State Spartans	Indiana State Sycamores
Big Ten	MVC
(25–6)	(33–0)
75	64
Head coach: Jud Heathcote	Head coach: Bill Hodges
- AP: 3
- Coaches: 4
- AP: 1
- Coaches: 1
	1st half	2nd half	Total
Michigan State Spartans	37	38	75
Indiana State Sycamores	28	36	64
- Date: March 26, 1979
- Venue: Special Events Center, Salt Lake City, Utah
- Referees: Gary Muncy, Lenny Wirtz, Hank Nichols
- Attendance: 15,410

United States TV coverage
- Network: NBC
- Announcers: Dick Enberg, Billy Packer, and Al McGuire

The 1979 NCAA Division I Basketball Championship Game was the final of the 1979 NCAA Division I basketball tournament and determined the national champion for the 1978–79 season. (Note: The NCAA did not sponsor a women's basketball championship until 1982; it therefore did not include the word "Men's" in the tournament name in 1979.) The game was held on March 26, at the Special Events Center (now the Jon M. Huntsman Center) at the University of Utah in Salt Lake City, Utah.

In the game, the Indiana State Sycamores of the Missouri Valley Conference faced the Michigan State Spartans of the Big Ten Conference. The Sycamores entered the contest undefeated for the season, while the Spartans had six losses. Spartans guard Magic Johnson and Sycamores forward Larry Bird competed against each other for the first time; the pair developed a rivalry in the National Basketball Association (NBA) in the 1980s.

Michigan State won 75–64 to claim the school's first national championship in men's basketball. The 1979 NCAA tournament final had the highest Nielsen ratings of any game in the history of American basketball.

== Background ==
=== Indiana State Sycamores ===
The Sycamores were not ranked in the Associated Press (AP) or United Press International preseason polls, and coaches in their Missouri Valley Conference (MVC) did not pick them to win the league. The team, which had been coached by Bob King in 1977–78, was led by senior forward Larry Bird, who had averaged 30.0 points per game during the previous season (second in NCAA Division I basketball) and been named an All-American in 1978. Indiana State's lineup also featured Carl Nicks, a junior guard who was returning to the school after spending his sophomore season at Gulf Coast Community College. However, the four starters from the 1977–78 team other than Bird had graduated. Before the start of the season, King suffered a heart attack and left the job; he was replaced by Bill Hodges. The Sycamores won their first game versus Lawrence University by a score of 99–56, and followed that performance by traveling to Purdue and winning by 10 points. Bird scored 40 points in Indiana State's next contest, a 74–70 victory at Evansville. That began a streak of seven games in which Bird scored over 30 points, including a 48-point effort against Butler.

Indiana State entered the AP poll at number 20 on December 12, rising as the season progressed and the team remained unbeaten. One challenge came during a game against Bradley, which elected to play with a triangle-and-two defense that Bradley coach Dick Versace called the "Bird Cage". The alignment was effective in containing Bird, who scored four points (his lowest total for Indiana State) on two field goal attempts; the Sycamores, however, managed to win. By February 13, the Sycamores were the top-ranked team in the country, and they held that position in the final rankings. Indiana State won all 16 of its games against MVC competition. The Sycamores were the number one seed in the Midwest region of the NCAA Tournament, and began their run in the event with an 86–69 second-round win over Virginia Tech. A 93–72 win over Oklahoma followed, and a two-point victory against Arkansas gave Indiana State a Final Four spot.

In the national semifinal against DePaul, Bird made 16 of 19 field goal attempts and had 16 rebounds and 9 assists. In a close game, Indiana State won 76–74 to reach the final without a loss on the season, at 33–0.

=== Michigan State Spartans ===
Coached by Jud Heathcote, Michigan State featured sophomore Magic Johnson, who had been instrumental in helping the team win the Big Ten Conference championship the previous season. It was their first solo conference title since 1958–59; the Spartans reached the regional finals at the 1978 NCAA Tournament, but lost by three points to eventual champion Kentucky. The team also had Greg Kelser, who was later chosen in the first round of the NBA draft. Writer Michael Wilbon said that entering the season, the team was "talented but seemed just a little less than they should have been in the Big Ten". The Spartans began the season with three straight wins, then lost by a point, 70–69, at North Carolina. Michigan State followed that defeat with six consecutive wins, and was top-ranked in the AP poll in early January. However, the team lost consecutive games to Illinois and Purdue (both losses coming on jumpers in the closing seconds), causing it to fall five places in the poll. Afterwards, the Spartans posted a blowout victory over Indiana and a win in overtime over Iowa. Ranked third in the AP poll following those games, the Spartans lost at Michigan 49–48, as Keith Smith made the winning free throw with no time remaining.

In their next game, an unheralded Northwestern team handed Michigan State its worst defeat of the season, beating them 83–65 for their fourth loss in six games. After that game, they faced Ohio State in a contest that required overtime; the Spartans emerged with an 84–79 win. That led to a winning streak; Michigan State ran off wins in their next nine games, defeating four of the teams that had beaten them in the process. Wisconsin snapped the Spartans' streak in their final game before the NCAA tournament, winning 83–81 on a long-range shot at the buzzer. The Spartans' 13–5 Big Ten record put them in a three-way tie with Iowa and Purdue for first in the conference, and they won 21 of 27 games in all regular season play; their final AP poll ranking was third.

Michigan State was awarded the second seed in the Mideast Regional for the NCAA Tournament, and defeated the Lamar Cardinals 95–64 in their first game, held in the second round. The Spartans advanced to the regional semifinal, where they topped third-seeded LSU 87–71. In the regional final, the Spartans defeated the Mideast region's top seed, Notre Dame, by a 12-point margin to advance to the Final Four, where they faced Penn. Michigan State won in the national semifinals 101–67 to gain a berth in the NCAA title game. Johnson had a triple-double in the contest, posting 29 points, 10 assists, and 10 rebounds. Entering the national championship game, they had a 25–6 record.

== Broadcasting ==
The 1979 NCAA Final Four, which included the national championship game, was televised by NBC. Announcing duties were performed by Dick Enberg, Al McGuire, and Billy Packer, while the halftime show was hosted by Bryant Gumbel. The Nielsen ratings for the championship game were 24.1; this figure is the highest for any basketball game in the United States as of 2017. The estimated audience was around 40 million people in 18 million households, and the number of viewers increased 20 percent from the 1978 NCAA Tournament final.

== Starting lineups ==
Indiana State	Position	Michigan State
Steve Reed	G	Terry Donnelly
Carl Nicks	G	† Earvin "Magic" Johnson
Brad Miley	F	Gregory Kelser
Alex Gilbert	F	Mike Brkovich
† Larry Bird	C	Ron Charles
† 1979 Consensus First Team All-American

== Game summary ==
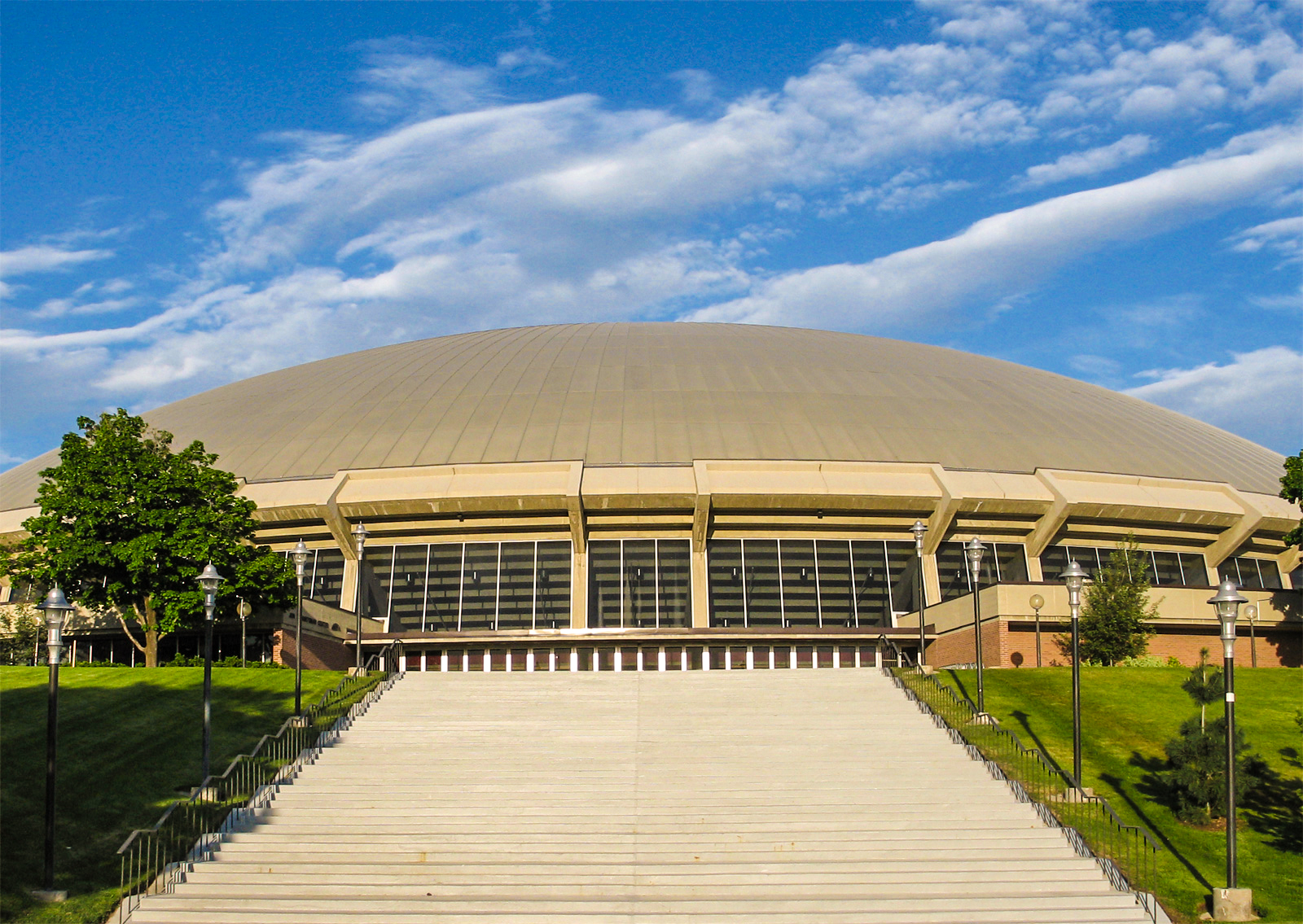
The Special Events Center served as the site of the 1979 NCAA Tournament final.

The national championship game took place on March 26. The Spartans gained control of the ball after the opening tip-off, only for Johnson to commit a traveling violation by making contact with the feet of Indiana State's Brad Miley. The Sycamores scored the first basket of the game, which was made by Steve Reed. The two teams played a close game in the early stages; a successful shot by Bird gave Indiana State a one-point advantage, and Michigan State called a timeout after his shot. The Spartans took a 9–8 lead on a basket by guard Terry Donnelly four minutes and twenty-six seconds into the contest. Michigan State used that play to begin a scoring run, outpointing Indiana State 9–0 during the stretch, which included a three-point play by guard Mike Brkovich. The Spartans' game plan on defense was to converge on Bird when he neared the baseline, in an effort to prevent him from receiving the ball. In addition, their strategy led to multiple instances in which Bird became uncertain as to whether he should pass or attempt a shot. Bird's effectiveness was limited, but Michigan State's players committed numerous personal fouls; both Johnson and Kelser had three fouls in the first half and were forced to leave the game. Despite their foul issues, the Spartans extended their lead over the Sycamores to 12 as the first half neared its end. After 20 minutes of play, Michigan State held a 37–28 advantage.

To begin the second half, Kelser made a shot six feet from the basket. Including those two points, the Spartans scored seven consecutive points to bring their lead to 16. Donnelly contributed four straight field goals as the Spartans' lead climbed to 50–34. Indiana State began to rally at this point, with two made field goal attempts each for Bird and Bob Heaton. While Michigan State's lead remained around 10 points, Kelser's foul troubles worsened when he committed his fourth of the game 4:27 into the second half. Michigan State was forced to remove him for reserve Jay Vincent, who was suffering from a foot bruise. In 19 overall minutes of playing time, Vincent had four fouls himself. Indiana State focused on playing close to the opposing basket while Kelser was out of the game, and Bird keyed a Sycamores scoring run with two field goals and a free throw. With 10:05 remaining, the Spartans' lead had been cut to 52–46. Kelser was brought into the game in response to the run, and did not commit another foul until the end. He and Johnson were responsible for the next eight points scored by the Spartans. The run included a four-point play by Johnson; he had a slam dunk while being fouled by Heaton, and sank two free throws that were awarded because Heaton was judged to have undercut him. For the last five minutes of the game, the Spartans held the ball for long periods to burn time off the clock. Bird received a technical foul call for one play in which he illegally stole the ball from Johnson while he was attempting an inbounds pass and attempted to score. Behind an offense that missed only 4 of 16 second half field goal attempts, Michigan State clinched its first men's basketball national championship by a 75–64 final score. Johnson was named the tournament's Most Outstanding Player, having scored 53 points on 17-of-25 shooting during the Final Four.

== Statistical summary ==
Johnson led all scorers in the national championship game with 24 points on 8-of-15 shooting. Kelser added 19 points and led the Spartans with 8 rebounds, one more than Johnson. Donnelly was the only other Michigan State player to score in double figures; he made all five of his field goal attempts and ended the game with 15 points. Ron Charles, Vincent, and Mike Brkovich were the other Spartans players to score points; each player contributed between five and seven points to Michigan State's total. Overall, the Spartans made 26 of their 43 shots.

For the Sycamores, Bird was the team's leading scorer with 19 points, but missed on two-thirds of his 21 field goal attempts. Bird was also the top rebounder for either side in the game, recording 13 rebounds. Nicks made half of his 14 shots and scored 17 points, while Heaton added 10 points. Four other players contributed points for Indiana State, but the team was successful on only 27 of its 64 field goal attempts. The Sycamores' free throw shooting was worse than Michigan State's; Indiana State missed 12 of its 22 attempts, while the Spartans had 10 misses in 33 free throws taken. The free throw scoring differential was thus greater than the margin of victory.

== Aftermath ==
Wilbon has credited the 1979 NCAA championship game with increasing interest in the NCAA Tournament, which underwent two field expansions in the following decade. Bird and Johnson both turned professional after the 1978–79 college season, and wound up playing for the Boston Celtics and Los Angeles Lakers, respectively. The 1979 NCAA championship game was the first encounter in a rivalry that developed as the two continued their careers. The Celtics and Lakers met three times in the NBA Finals during the 1980s, and the pair helped to increase national interest in the NBA. ESPN's Andy Katz wrote that Bird and Johnson "helped create the interest in the Final Four and they made today's NBA".

== Bibliography ==
- Bird, Larry; Johnson, Magic; MacMullan, Jackie (2010). When the Game was Ours. Mariner Books. ISBN 978-0-547-39458-9.
- Davis, Seth (2009). When March Went Mad: The Game That Transformed Basketball. Macmillan Publishers. ISBN 9780805088106.
- Emmerich, Michael (2013). 100 Things Michigan State Fans Should Know & Do Before They Die. Triumph Books. ISBN 9781623682897.
- Mitchell, Nicole; Ennis, Lisa A. (2007). Encyclopedia of Title IX and Sports. Greenwood Publishing Group. ISBN 9780313335877.
- Wilner, Barry; Rappoport, Ken (2012). The Big Dance: The Story of the NCAA Basketball Tournament. Taylor Trade Publications. ISBN 9781589796218.
