= Brad Miley =

American basketball player (born 1958)

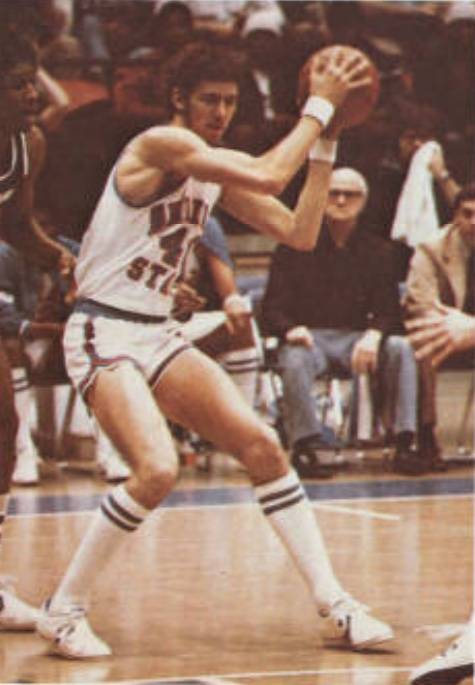
- Miley with Indiana State, c. 1977

Personal information
- Born: May 15, 1958 (age 68) Indiana, U.S.
- Listed height: 6 ft 8 in (2.03 m)
- Listed weight: 194 lb (88 kg)

Career information
- High school: Rushville (Rushville, Indiana)
- College: Indiana State (1976–1980)
- NBA draft: 1980: undrafted
- Playing career: 1980–1983
- Position: Forward
- Number: 40

Career history

Playing
- 1980–1981: Valur
- 1982: Geelong Cats
- 1982–1983: Keflavík

Coaching
- 1982–1984: Keflavík

Career highlights
- Icelandic Cup (1981)

Brad Miley (born May 15, 1958) is an American former basketball player and coach. After graduating from Indiana State in 1980, he played professionally in Australia and Iceland, winning the Icelandic Cup in 1981. In 2016, Miley was inducted into the Indiana Basketball Hall of Fame.

== High school ==
Miley played his senior season for Rushville Consolidated High School in Rushville, Indiana under head coach Larry Angle, where Miley was a member of Rushville's 26–2 1976 state runner-up squad. He remains the school's single-season rebounding leader with 394 rebounds in 28 games (14.1 rpg). Miley set a state finals record 29 rebounds in the Lions' come-from-behind semi-final game against East Chicago Washington. He followed it up in the state championship game with 16 rebounds in the loss to Marion.

== College career ==
Miley played college basketball for Indiana State from 1976 to 1980 where he became known for his defense.

Miley started all 34 games during the 1978–79 season as Indiana State finished 33–1 and the runner-up to the NCAA championship, losing 75–64 to Michigan State with Magic Johnson and Greg Kelser in the NCAA Final. Miley averaged 5.7 points, 6.0 rebounds, 1.6 assists, shooting 62% from the field, playing alongside Larry Bird, Carl Nicks and Bob Heaton under coach Bill Hodges.

In 120 career games at Indiana State, Miley averaged 4.6 points 5.2 rebounds and 2.2 assists, shooting 53% from the floor.

== Professional career ==
In October 1980, Miley signed with reigning Úrvalsdeild karla champions Valur. In his debut, he scored 14 points in Valur's overtime victory against ÍS. For the season, Miley averaged a team high 19.7 points in 17 games but Valur failed to repeat as champions. In the Icelandic Cup, Valur fared better, beating national champions Njarðvík in the Cup final where Miley scored 13 points.

Miley spent the 1982 NBL season with the Geelong Cats where he averaged 7.6 points and 10.1 rebounds in 28 games. The Cats finished with the second best record in the league and lost to the West Adelaide Bearcats in the NBL finals.

He returned to the Úrvalsdeild in November 1982 when he signed as player-coach with newly promoted Keflavík, replacing Tim Higgins. His first game for Keflavík was against Íþróttafélag Reykjavíkur where his matchup against former teammate Pétur Guðmundsson was highly anticipated. In the game, Miley scored 10 points in Keflavík's 73–67 victory. For the season, Miley averaged 15.8 in 14 games, helping Keflavík finish as the runner-up to the national championship. After 19 games, Keflavík and Valur were tied at the top with a 14–5 record. Incidentally, they faced each other in the last game of the season. In the game, Keflavík lost 88–87 after a controversial three second violation was called on Miley with few seconds left in the game. After the season he finished as the runner-up to Tim Dwyer for the Úrvalsdeild Foreign Player of the Year award.

He returned to Keflavík for the 1983–1984 season, this time only as the head coach as foreign players had been barred from playing in the Icelandic leagues during the summer. Without Miley playing, Keflavík was unable to reproduce its previous season's success and ended last in the league and were relegated to 1. deild karla.

== Honors ==
- In 2007, the 1978–79 Men's Basketball Team was inducted into the Indiana State University Athletics Hall of Fame. Team members were: Larry Bird, Tom Crowder, Eric Curry, Alex Gilbert, Bob Heaton, Rod McNelly, Brad Miley, Rich Nemcek, Carl Nicks, Steve Reed, Bob Ritter, Leroy Staley, Scott Turner. Head Coach: Bill Hodges. Assistant Coaches: Terry Thimlar and Mel Daniels. Graduate Assistant Coach: Danny King. Head Trainer: Bob Behnke. Student Manager/Trainer: Rick Shaw.
- On March 23, 2016, Miley was inducted into the Indiana Basketball Hall of Fame.
