= Jon M. Huntsman Center =

Arena at the University of Utah

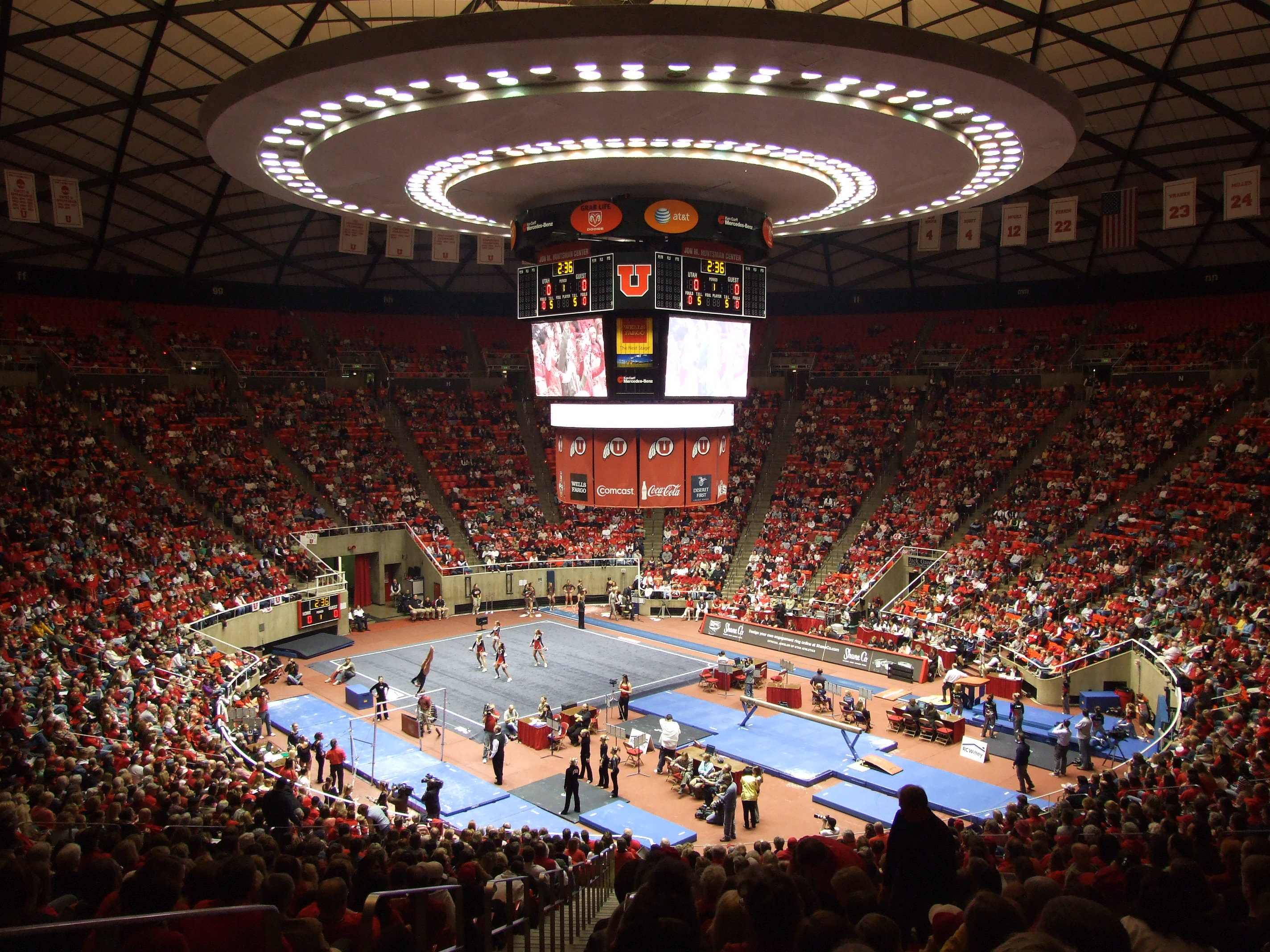
- Red Rocks gymnastics meet in 2008

- Location in the United States Location in Utah
- Former names: Special Events Center (1969–1987)
- Address: 1825 E. South Campus Dr.
- Location: University of Utah; Salt Lake City, Utah, U.S.
- Coordinates: 40.762°N 111.839°W
- Owner: University of Utah
- Operator: University of Utah
- Capacity: 15,000 Basketball And Volleyball
- Surface: Multi-surface
- Record attendance: 16,019 (March 6, 2015; gymnastics vs. Michigan)

Construction
- Groundbreaking: 1967
- Opened: November 30, 1969; 56 years ago
- Cost: $10.392 million ($68 million in 2024)
- Architect: Robert Fowler

Tenants
- Utah Utes (NCAA Division I) (men's & women's basketball, women's gymnastics and women's volleyball)

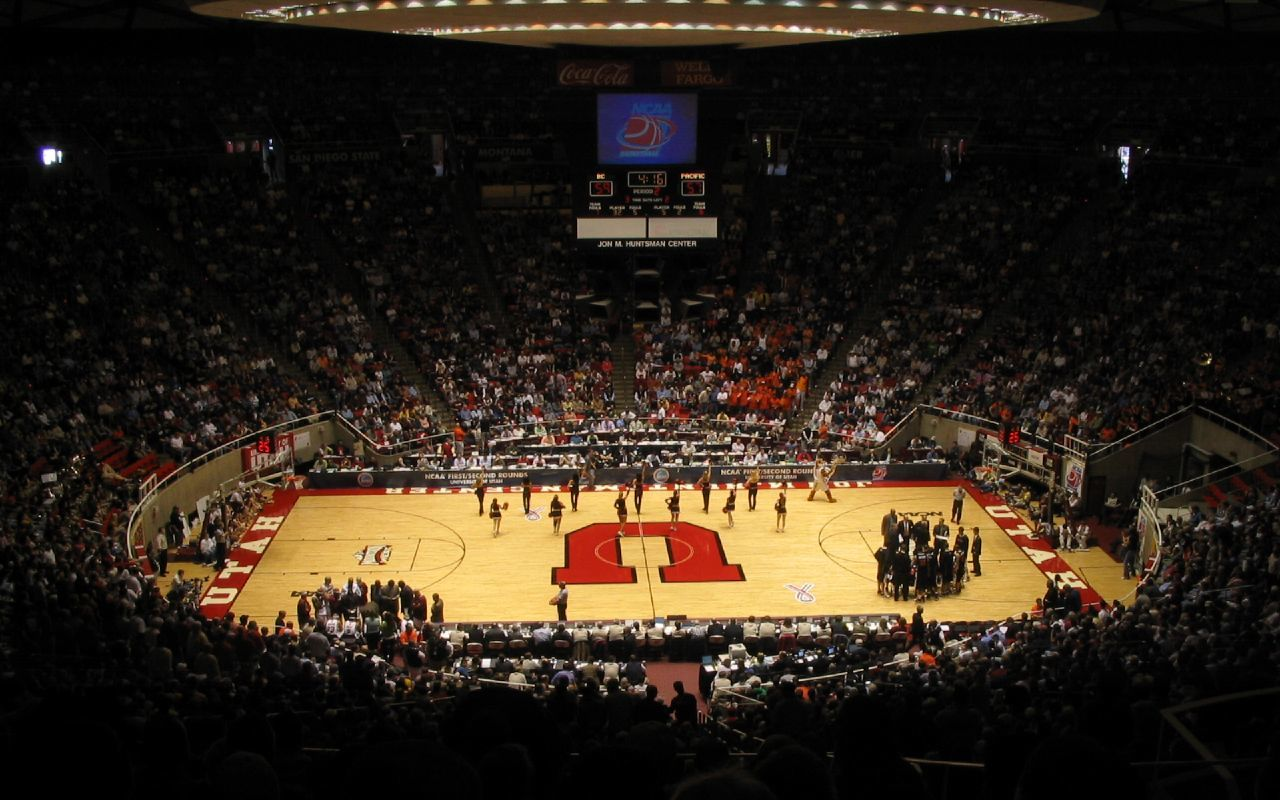
2006 NCAA tournament: Boston College vs. Pacific

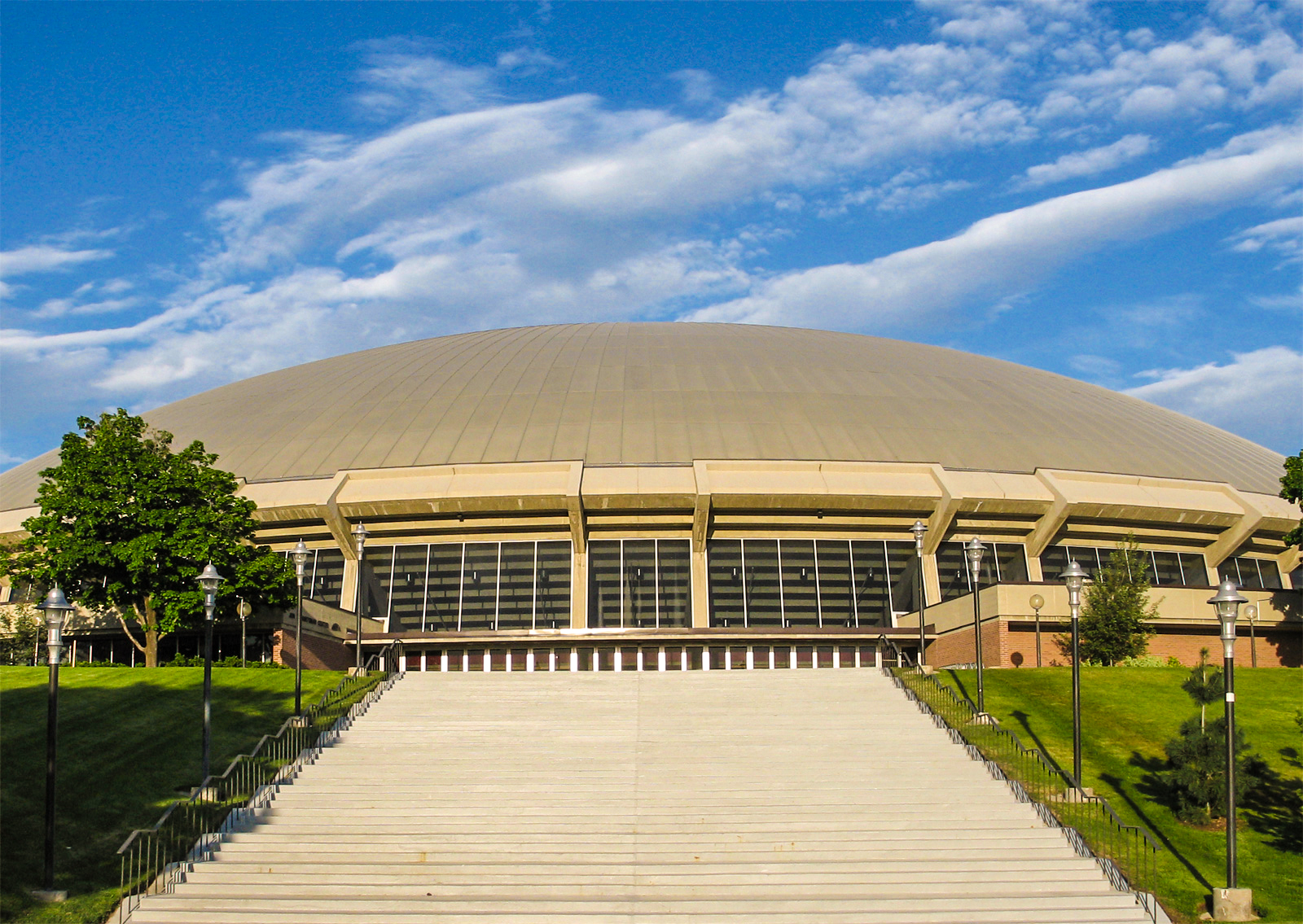
Exterior in 2009

The Jon M. Huntsman Center is a 15,000-seat indoor arena in the western United States, on the campus of the University of Utah in Salt Lake City. It is the home of the Utah Utes of the Big 12 Conference, the primary venue for basketball and gymnastics.

== History ==
Opened 56 years ago in late 1969 as the Special Events Center, it succeeded Nielsen Fieldhouse as the campus' primary indoor arena. It was renamed in 1987 in honor of chemicals entrepreneur and philanthropist Jon M. Huntsman (1937–2018), father of Utah's former governor Jon Huntsman, Jr.

From its opening until the completion of the Delta Center in 1991, the Huntsman Center was one of Salt Lake City's premier sports and entertainment venues (along with the Salt Palace (1969–1993), the home of the Utah Stars (ABA) and later the Utah Jazz (NBA)).

Architecturally, it was once known for its steel cloud, which hung from the arena's silver dome interior. The steel cloud held the arena's center court scoreboard, sound and lighting systems. The scoreboard was upgraded in the 1980s with the addition of state-of-the-art rear projection video screens. The rear projection system was upgraded in 1995, and replaced in 2006 by four LED video screens. In 2014, the arena was renovated again. The $6 million project removed the steel cloud, as well as added a new floor, LED lights, sound system, drapes, and two grand entrances to house a Hall of Fame and Legacy Hall.

On May 12, 1973, The Jackson 5 performed at the center.

The facility hosted the 1989 Western Athletic Conference men's basketball tournament.

In addition to athletics and concerts, the arena has hosted many academic and intellectual events over the years, such as a public lecture by renowned British astrophysicist Stephen Hawking in 1995, which was reported to be the largest live audience that Hawking had ever addressed at that time.

The facility hosted two games of the Utah Jazz Summer League in 2016 due to a concert at Vivint Arena. In 2017, the Utah Jazz Summer League moved to the Huntsman Center for all six games & four teams due to Vivint Arena undergoing renovations.

The 15,000-seat multi-purpose arena is home to the University of Utah's "Runnin' Utes" basketball teams (men's and women's), "Red Rocks" women's gymnastics team and women's volleyball team. It also hosts concerts, mostly second-tier acts; most premier concerts have been hosted at Vivint Arena (Delta Center).

When Utah joined the Big 12 in 2024, it became the fourth largest arena in the conference.

The elevation at street level is approximately 4,780 feet (1,455 m) above sea level, which was second-highest in the Pac-12 Conference.

== NCAA tournament ==
The Huntsman Center hosted the first and second rounds of the NCAA tournament 12 times (1984, 1985, 1987, 1988, 1990, 1991, 1993, 1995, 1997, 2000, 2003, and 2006). It hosted the West Regional Final twice (1971, 1981) and one Final Four (1979). Due to the frequency of hosting first- and second-round games, the Huntsman Center is third all-time in NCAA Tournament games hosted, with 81.

Since 2010, NCAA tournament games in the city have been played at Delta Center, home of the NBA's Utah Jazz. Other venues for past NCAA games in the state include the Marriott Center in Provo and the Dee Events Center in Ogden.

=== 1979 Final Four ===
The arena hosted the 1979 Final Four in late March, featuring the start of the rivalry between all-time greats Magic Johnson and Larry Bird. Magic's Michigan State team defeated Bird's previously unbeaten Indiana State in the final on March 26, which remains the most-watched college basketball game in history. Many observers consider the Magic-Bird rivalry established here and carried into the NBA when both entered the league that fall to be a major factor in the league's 1980s renaissance.

== See also ==
- List of NCAA Division I basketball arenas

Preceded by Checkerdome	NCAA Men's Division I Basketball tournament Finals Venue; 1979	Succeeded by Market Square Arena
