= 1978–79 New Mexico State Aggies basketball team =

American college basketball season

1978–79 New Mexico State Aggies men's basketball

NCAA tournament, first round
- Conference: Missouri Valley Conference
- Record: 22–10 (11–5 MVC)
- Head coach: Ken Hayes (5th season)
- Home arena: Pan American Center

1978–79 Missouri Valley Conference men's basketball standings
	Conf.				Overall
Team	W		L	PCT	W		L	PCT
No. 1 Indiana State †	16	–	0	1.000	33	–	1	.971
New Mexico State	11	–	5	.688	22	–	10	.688
Wichita State	8	–	8	.500	14	–	14	.500
Creighton	8	–	8	.500	14	–	13	.519
Southern Illinois	8	–	8	.500	15	–	13	.536
Drake	8	–	8	.500	15	–	12	.556
Tulsa	7	–	9	.438	13	–	14	.481
West Texas State	3	–	13	.188	8	–	19	.296
Bradley	3	–	13	.188	9	–	17	.346
† 1979 MVC tournament winner Rankings from AP Poll

The 1978–79 New Mexico State Aggies men's basketball team represented New Mexico State University in the 1978–79 college basketball season. This was Ken Hayes's 5th season as head coach. The Aggies played their home games at Pan American Center and competed in the Missouri Valley Conference. They finished the season 22–10, 11–5 in MVC play. Though they finished second in the conference standings, the Aggies were five games behind Larry Bird's No. 1 Indiana State Sycamores. They earned an at-large bid to the NCAA tournament, but fell in the first round to Weber State, a team they had beaten earlier in the season, 81–78 in overtime.

== Roster ==
1978–79 New Mexico State Aggies men's basketball team
Players
Coaches

Pos.	#	Name	Height	Weight	Year	Hometown
C		Albert Slab Jones	6 ft 7 in (2.01 m)	—	Jr
F		Robert Gunn	6 ft 7 in (2.01 m)	—	Sr

Head coach

- Ken Hayes (Northeastern State)

Assistant coach(es)

Legend

- (C) Team captain
- (S) Suspended
- (I) Ineligible
- (W) Walk-on
- Injured
- Current redshirt

== Schedule and results ==
Date time, TV	Rank^{#}	Opponent^{#}	Result	Record	Site (attendance) city, state
Regular season
Jan 15, 1979*		at No. 5 Indiana State	L 69–73	8–5	Hulman Center (10,226); Terre Haute, Indiana
Feb 1, 1979*		No. 2 Indiana State	L 89–91	12–6	Pan American Center; Las Cruces, New Mexico
Feb 3, 1979*		at Creighton	L 71–77	12–7	Omaha Civic Auditorium; Omaha, Nebraska
MVC tournament
Feb 27, 1979*		Tulsa; Quarterfinals	W 82–79	20–8	Pan American Center; Las Cruces, New Mexico
Mar 1, 1979*		Wichita State; Semifinals	W 85–81	21–8	Pan American Center; Las Cruces, New Mexico
Mar 3, 1979*		at No. 1 Indiana State; Championship game	L 59–69	22–9	Hulman Center; Terre Haute, Indiana
NCAA tournament
Mar 9, 1979*	(10 MW)	vs. (7 MW) Weber State; First round	L 78–81 ^{OT}	22–10	Allen Fieldhouse; Lawrence, Kansas
*Non-conference game. ^{#}Rankings from AP Poll. (#) Tournament seedings in parentheses. MW=Midwest. All times are in Mountain Time.
