= Ron Charles =

Ron Charles may refer to:

- Ron Charles (basketball) (born 1959), American basketball player
- Ron Charles (critic) (born 1962), American literary critic
