= 1979 Missouri Valley Conference men's basketball tournament =

- Classification: Division I
- Season: 1978–79
- Teams: 8
- Site: Campus sites
- Finals site: Hulman Center; Terre Haute, Indiana
- Champions: Indiana State (1st title)
- Winning coach: Bill Hodges (1st title)
- MVP: None selected

1978–79 Missouri Valley Conference men's basketball standings
	Conf.				Overall
Team	W		L	PCT	W		L	PCT
No. 1 Indiana State †	16	–	0	1.000	33	–	1	.971
New Mexico State	11	–	5	.688	22	–	10	.688
Wichita State	8	–	8	.500	14	–	14	.500
Creighton	8	–	8	.500	14	–	13	.519
Southern Illinois	8	–	8	.500	15	–	13	.536
Drake	8	–	8	.500	15	–	12	.556
Tulsa	7	–	9	.438	13	–	14	.481
West Texas State	3	–	13	.188	8	–	19	.296
Bradley	3	–	13	.188	9	–	17	.346
† 1979 MVC tournament winner Rankings from AP Poll

The 1979 Missouri Valley Conference men's basketball tournament was held February 27–March 3; the quarterfinal and semifinal rounds were played on campus sites and the final was contested at the Hulman Center on the campus of Indiana State University in Terre Haute, Indiana.

Led by future Basketball Hall of Fame member Larry Bird, top-seeded Indiana State defeated New Mexico State in the championship game, 69–59, to win their first MVC tournament title.

The Sycamores subsequently received an automatic bid to the 1979 NCAA tournament, where they would advance to the national championship game.

== Format ==
Even without any new Missouri Valley Conference members, the conference decreased the size of the tournament field from nine to eight. In turn, only the top eight teams from the conference's regular season standings were included in the bracket.

All eight qualifying teams were placed into the first round, seeded and paired based on regular season conference records. The highest-seeded team in each game served as the host.

== Bracket ==
Quarterfinals; Tuesday, February 27; Campus Sites
1	No. 1 Indiana State *	94
8	West Texas State	84
4	Creighton *	67
5	Southern Illinois	71
2	New Mexico State *	85
7	Tulsa	79
3	Wichita State *	70
6	Drake	69

Semifinals; Thursday, March 1 Campus Sites
1	No. 1 Indiana State *	79
5	Southern Illinois	72
2	New Mexico State *	85
3	Wichita State	81

Final; Saturday, March 3 Hulman Center
1	No. 1 Indiana State *	69
2	New Mexico State	59

Note: * indicates host institution
