= Greg Kelser =

American basketball player and commentator

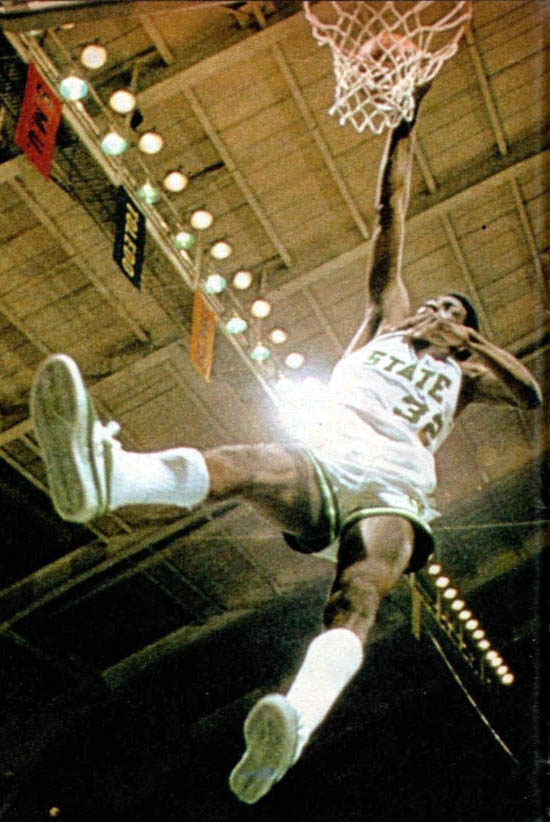
- Kelser doing a dunk with Michigan State

Personal information
- Born: September 17, 1957 (age 69) Panama City, Florida, U.S.
- Listed height: 6 ft 7 in (2.01 m)
- Listed weight: 190 lb (86 kg)

Career information
- High school: Henry Ford (Detroit, Michigan)
- College: Michigan State (1975–1979)
- NBA draft: 1979: 1st round, 4th overall pick
- Drafted by: Detroit Pistons
- Playing career: 1979–1985
- Position: Small forward
- Number: 32, 3, 20, 11

Career history
- 1979–1981: Detroit Pistons
- 1981–1983: Seattle SuperSonics
- 1983–1984: San Diego Clippers
- 1985: Indiana Pacers

Career highlights
- NCAA champion (1979); Third-team All-American – AP (1979); No. 32 retired by Michigan State Spartans

Career NBA statistics
- Points: 2,961 (9.7 ppg)
- Rebounds: 1,402 (4.6 rpg)
- Assists: 411 (1.3 apg)
- Stats at NBA.com
- Stats at Basketball Reference

Gregory Kelser (born September 17, 1957) is an American former professional basketball player and current television color commentator. Nicknamed "Special K", Kelser was a key member of the 1979 NCAA Champion Michigan State Spartans and spent six seasons playing in the National Basketball Association (NBA).

== Early life ==
Kelser grew up in a military family, spending part of his childhood in Okinawa, Japan. His father, Walter Kelser Jr., was a monumental influence on his life. He credits his exposure to military discipline with contributing to his later success in athletics. Kelser stated, "A military background helped me a lot. My mother stressed and my dad enforced a respect for authority. It was a time when you knew your place. That transferred easily to the court and the classroom. I always knew who was in charge. It was my job to listen and learn." Raised Catholic, he attended a parochial middle school in Boston where he was the only Black student.

== Amateur career ==
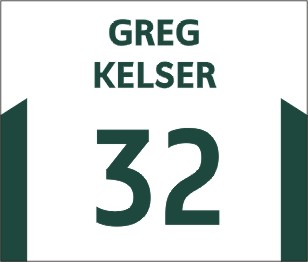
Kelser's #32 was retired by Michigan State University after he graduated in 1979

Upon graduating from Henry Ford High School in Detroit in 1975, Kelser was brought to Michigan State by Gus Ganakas, who left the head coach position after Kelser's freshman season. In East Lansing, Kelser earned him the sobriquet "Special K", a play on the Kelloggs breakfast cereal. In his junior year (the freshman year for new additions Earvin "Magic" Johnson and Jay Vincent) under coach Jud Heathcote, the Spartans squad had an impressive season, racking up a 25–5 record, the Big Ten Conference title, and a berth in the 1978 NCAA tournament, where they made it to the regional finals before losing narrowly to eventual champion Kentucky, 52–49.

Then, as a senior, he and Johnson led the Spartans to the 1979 NCAA tournament championship, defeating Larry Bird and Indiana State 75–64. The title was the first in the school's history. Kelser was often on the receiving end of spectacular alley-oop passes from Johnson and later wrote a book about his basketball experiences at MSU.

On the 1979 NCAA Division I Basketball Championship Game, Kelser said, “My biggest thrill in basketball was playing in a game that featured Larry and Magic – two of the greatest players in NBA history. It was the way it should have been, Magic and Bird playing for the national title. That's why that game is still talked about today. The memory is made more special, because I got a chance to be a difference maker, and, that's something I'm proud of.”

Kelser finished his career at Michigan State averaging 17.5 ppg and 9.5 rpg and was named third-team All-American. In addition, he was a two-time Academic All-American. He was the first Big Ten Conference player, and remains the only player in Spartan basketball history, to score over 2,000 points with over 1,000 rebounds.

== NBA career ==
Kelser was drafted by the hometown Detroit Pistons as the 4th pick in the 1979 NBA draft. He quickly established himself for the rebuilding Pistons, averaging what would be a career high 14.2 ppg in his first season, but chronic knee injuries would begin to play a factor in his NBA career, as he was limited to just 25 games played in 1980–81. The Pistons, burned in recent history by similar knee issues with star Bob Lanier, attempted to move on, but a December 1980 trade with the Seattle SuperSonics was rejected after Kelser failed his physical. The two teams would revisit the trade, and Kelser was traded to Seattle a year later, in December 1981, with Detroit acquiring Vinnie Johnson in return.

Kelser would spend most of two seasons with the Sonics, averaging, 7.0 ppg, and was then traded in 1983 to the San Diego Clippers, where he averaged 11.0 ppg in a career high 80 games played. He would wrap up his NBA career with the Indiana Pacers before his knee injuries forced his retirement at the end of the 1984-85 NBA season. In total, over six NBA seasons, Kelser averaging 9.7 ppg and 4.6 rpg, never playing a full slate of games in any season.

== Announcing career ==
Since leaving the NBA, Kelser has worked extensively as a sports announcer and/or commentator on radio and television, working games as a commentator for Detroit Pistons games on FanDuel Sports Network Detroit Detroit with his partner George Blaha and on the Big Ten Network.

== Personal life ==
Kelser finished his degree at Michigan State in 1981, graduating with a Bachelor of Science in Social Sciences. Spartan coach Jud Heathcote brought focus to Kelser in completing the degree, "Coach Heathcote stayed on me and showed me he cared. It would've been easy for him not to worry about it. Instead, I had no choice to get it over with and get him off my back. I wasn't going to walk at commencement. But my mom said, `Oh, yes, you are!' I'm really glad I did. And I remember Jud being there to watch me."

Kelser was named to the Michigan Sports Hall of Fame in 2006, and his high school, Henry Ford High School, dedicated the Gregory Kelser Gymnasium in October 2007. He was inducted into the Michigan State University Athletics Hall of Fame in 1996. He lives in Franklin, Michigan with his wife Donna.

== Career statistics ==
Legend
GP	Games played	GS	Games started	MPG	Minutes per game
FG%	Field goal percentage	3P%	3-point field goal percentage	FT%	Free throw percentage
RPG	Rebounds per game	APG	Assists per game	SPG	Steals per game
BPG	Blocks per game	PPG	Points per game	**Bold**	Career high

=== NBA ===
==== Regular season ====
Year	Team	GP	GS	MPG	FG%	3P%	FT%	RPG	APG	SPG	BPG	PPG
1979–80	Detroit	50		24.7	.472	.200	**.719**	**5.5**	**2.2**	1.2	.7	**14.2**
1980–81	Detroit	25		**26.2**	.421	.000	.642	4.8	1.8	**1.4**	**1.2**	12.3
1981–82	Detroit	11	0	16.6	.407	.000	.659	3.5	1.1	.5	.6	8.8
1981–82	Seattle	49	10	11.4	.438	–	.655	3.1	.9	.3	.3	4.9
1982–83	Seattle	**80**	9	18.8	**.549**	.000	.673	5.0	1.2	.7	.4	8.3
1983–84	San Diego	**80**	**21**	22.3	.519	**.333**	.702	4.9	1.1	.9	.4	11.0
1984–85	Indiana	10	0	11.4	.396	.000	.714	1.9	1.3	.7	.0	6.2
Career		305	40	19.8	.486	.167	.686	4.6	1.3	.8	.5	9.7

==== Playoffs ====
Year	Team	GP	MPG	FG%	3P%	FT%	RPG	APG	SPG	BPG	PPG
1982	Seattle	**3**	2.0	.000	–	**1.000**	1.0	.3	.0	.0	1.3
1983	Seattle	2	**9.5**	**.400**	–	–	**3.0**	**.5**	**.5**	.0	**2.0**
Career		5	5.0	.286	–	1.000	1.8	.4	.2	.0	1.6

== See also ==
- List of NCAA Division I men's basketball players with 2000 points and 1000 rebounds
