= 1978–79 Indiana State Sycamores men's basketball team =

American college basketball season

1978–79 Indiana State Sycamores men's basketball
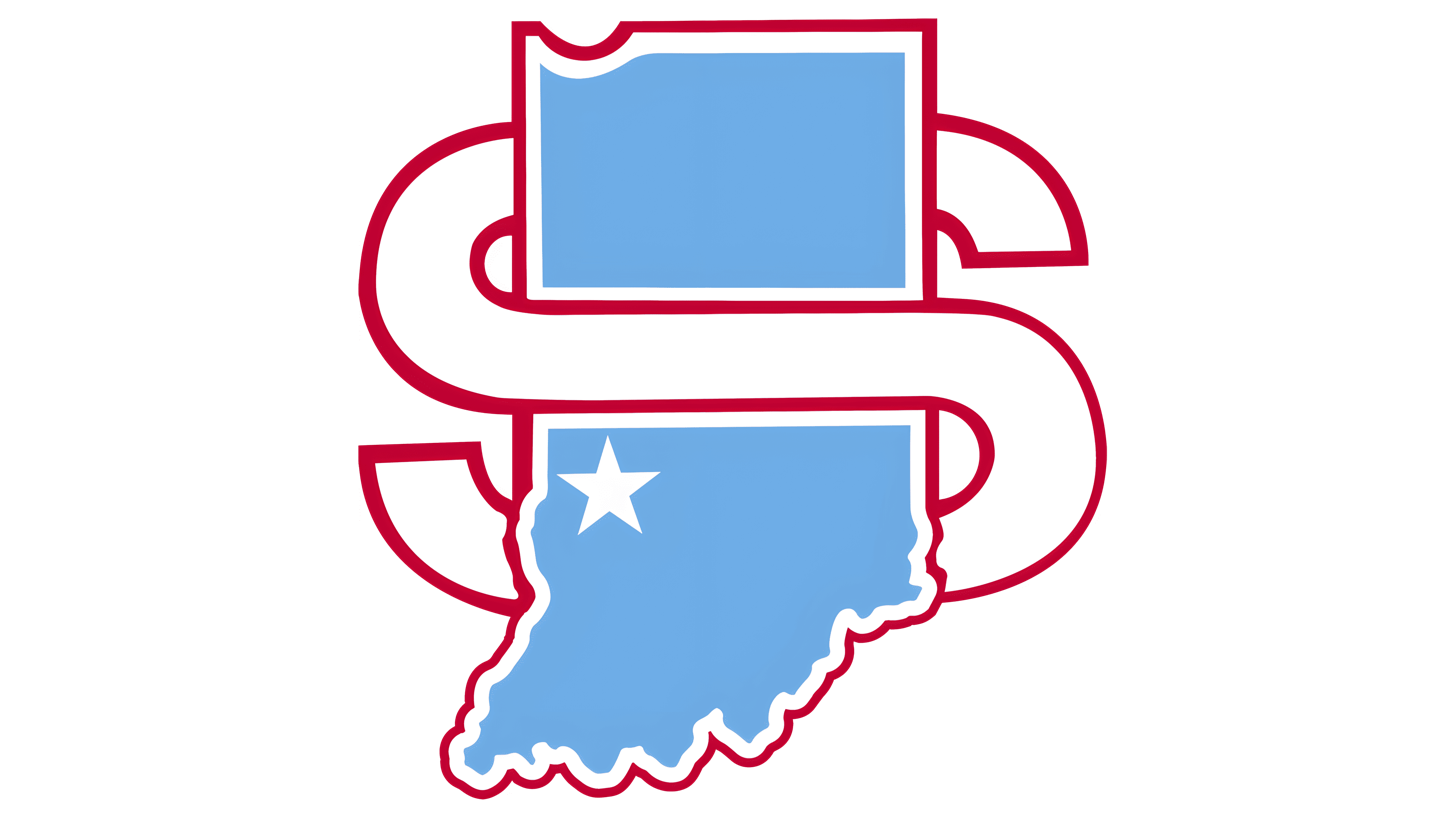

NCAA tournament, Runner-up NCAA Division I regular season champions MVC tournament champions MVC regular season champions

National Championship Game, L 64-75 vs. Michigan State
- Conference: Missouri Valley Conference

Ranking
- Coaches: No. 1
- AP: No. 1
- Record: 33–1 (16–0 MVC)
- Head coach: Bill Hodges (1st season)
- Assistant coaches: Mel Daniels (3rd season); Terry Thimlar; Danny King
- MVP: Larry Bird
- Home arena: Hulman Center

1978–79 Missouri Valley Conference men's basketball standings
	Conf.				Overall
Team	W		L	PCT	W		L	PCT
No. 1 Indiana State †	16	–	0	1.000	33	–	1	.971
New Mexico State	11	–	5	.688	22	–	10	.688
Wichita State	8	–	8	.500	14	–	14	.500
Creighton	8	–	8	.500	14	–	13	.519
Southern Illinois	8	–	8	.500	15	–	13	.536
Drake	8	–	8	.500	15	–	12	.556
Tulsa	7	–	9	.438	13	–	14	.481
West Texas State	3	–	13	.188	8	–	19	.296
Bradley	3	–	13	.188	9	–	17	.346
† 1979 MVC tournament winner Rankings from AP Poll

The 1978–79 Indiana State Sycamores men's basketball team is considered the greatest in the school's history. The Sycamores competed as members of the Missouri Valley Conference during the 1978–79 NCAA Division I men's basketball season, playing their home games at the Hulman Center in Terre Haute, Indiana. Led by first-year head coach Bill Hodges and National Player of the Year Larry Bird, Indiana State was unranked to begin the season, but swept through the regular season unbeaten. Bird led the number 1 ranked Sycamores to the national title game versus the Magic Johnson-led number 3 Michigan State Spartans, and ended the season as National runner-up with a record of 33–1 (16–0 MVC). To date, the 1978–79 Sycamores are the only team to advance this far in their first-ever NCAA appearance. They had been the last unbeaten team to reach the national title game until Gonzaga in 2021.

== Roster ==
The Sycamores were led by Bird, the NCAA Player of the Year, and his 28.6 scoring average. He was followed by Carl Nicks’ 19.3 average. The starting lineup also included Miley, Alex Gilbert and Steve Reed. Heaton and Leroy Staley were key reserves. The remainder of the roster consisted of Tom Crowder, Eric Curry, Rod McNelly, Rich Nemcek, Bob Ritter and Scott Turner.

1978–79 Indiana State Sycamores men's basketball team
Players
Coaches

Pos.	#	Name	Height	Weight	Year	Previous school	Hometown
G	5	Bob Ritter	6 ft 3 in (1.91 m)	189 lb (86 kg)	Jr	Northwest	Indianapolis, IN
F	10	Scott Turner	6 ft 5 in (1.96 m)	193 lb (88 kg)	Fr	North Lawrence	Bedford, IN
G	15	Rod McNelly	6 ft 2 in (1.88 m)	173 lb (78 kg)	Fr	Speedway	Speedway, IN
G/F	20	Rich Nemcek	6 ft 6 in (1.98 m)	182 lb (83 kg)	Jr	Morton	Hammond, IN
SG	22	Carl Nicks	6 ft 2 in (1.88 m)	186 lb (84 kg)	Jr	Englewood Tech	Chicago, IL
PG	23	Steve Reed	6 ft 2 in (1.88 m)	166 lb (75 kg)	So	Warsaw	Warsaw, IN
F	24	Tom Crowder	6 ft 5 in (1.96 m)	197 lb (89 kg)	Sr	North Vermillion	Cayuga, IN
F	30	Bob Heaton	6 ft 5 in (1.96 m)	192 lb (87 kg)	Jr	Clay City	Cory, IN
C	32	Eric Curry	6 ft 9 in (2.06 m)	180 lb (82 kg)	Jr	Marie Curie	Chicago, IL
C	33	Larry Bird	6 ft 9 in (2.06 m)	215 lb (98 kg)	Sr	Springs Valley	French Lick, IN
F	40	Brad Miley	6 ft 8 in (2.03 m)	194 lb (88 kg)	Jr	Rushville	Rushville, IN
F	42	Alex Gilbert	6 ft 7 in (2.01 m)	184 lb (83 kg)	Jr	East St. Louis	East St. Louis, IL
G/F	44	Leroy Staley	6 ft 4 in (1.93 m)	193 lb (88 kg)	Sr	Tampa Jefferson	Tampa, FL

Head coach

Bill Hodges (Purdue)

Assistant coach(es)

Legend

- (C) Team captain
- (S) Suspended
- (I) Ineligible
- (W) Walk-on
- Injured
- Current redshirt

Roster

== Season summary ==
In 1979, the NCAA tournament championship game was the most-watched game in the history of the sport, in no small part because of Indiana State star Larry Bird. Bird was not a one-man show, but the unheralded Sycamores rode him to a 33–0 record heading into the title game. The well-rounded Bird averaged 29 points, 14.8 rebounds, and, most significantly, six assists as he changed the way the game was played.

== Offseason ==
Head coach Bob King suffered a stroke and was unable to continue as head coach of the Sycamores. Assistant Bill Hodges was elevated to the position of head coach.

=== Exhibition vs. Soviet National Team ===
On November 20, the touring Soviet National team came to Hulman Center to play Indiana State. ISU defeated the Soviets, 83–79, to become one of only four college teams to beat them that season.

== Regular season ==
During the 1978–79 season, Indiana State qualified for the NCAA tournament. ISU finished the regular season 29–0, 16–0 in the Missouri Valley Conference, and earned the top ranking in the country.

The only time that the perfect regular season was in jeopardy was on Feb. 1. The Sycamores were 18–0 against New Mexico State. With three seconds remaining, the Sycamores were down 83–81. New Mexico State was at the free throw line and the shot was missed. The missed shot was rebounded by Brad Miley and passed to Bob Heaton. Heaton launched a 50-foot desperation shot which banked through the net to send the game into overtime.

Bird received several honors at the end of regular season. He won the USBWA College Player of the Year, Naismith and Wooden Awards, given to the year's top male college basketball player.

== Schedule and results ==
Date time, TV	Rank^{#}	Opponent^{#}	Result	Record	High points	High rebounds	High assists	Site (attendance) city, state
Exhibition
11/19/1978*; 1:30 p.m.		Soviet National Team	W 83–79		24 – Nicks	13 – Bird	6 – Miley	Hulman Center; Terre Haute, Indiana
Regular season
11/25/1978*; 7:30 p.m.		Lawrence College	W 99–56	1–0	27 – Nicks	15 – Gilbert	10 – Bird	Hulman Center (8,476); Terre Haute, Indiana
11/27/1978*; 7:35 p.m.		at Purdue	W 63–53	2–0	22 – Bird	15 – Bird	4 – 2 Tied	Mackey Arena (14,123); West Lafayette, Indiana
12/2/1978*; 7:35 p.m.		at Evansville	W 74–70	3–0	40 – Bird	9 – Bird	2 – Bird	Roberts Municipal Stadium (12,488); Evansville, Indiana
12/4/1978*; 7:30 p.m.		Illinois State	W 78–76	4–0	31 – Bird	19 – Bird	7 – Reed	Hulman Center (10,189); Terre Haute, Indiana
12/8/1978*		vs. East Carolina; Hatter Classic	W 102–79	5–0	32 – Bird	9 – Bird	3 – 2 tied	Edmunds Center (3,510); Deland, Florida
12/9/1978*		vs. Cleveland State; Hatter Classic	W 102–71	6–0	37 – Bird	15 – Bird	6 – Nicks	Edmunds Center; Deland, Florida
12/12/1978*	No. 20	at Ball State	W 93–85	7–0	31 – Bird	14 – Bird	8 – Nicks	Irving Gymnasium (6,880); Muncie, Indiana
12/16/1978*	No. 20	Butler	W 109–71	8–0	48 – Bird	19 – Bird	11 – Reed	Hulman Center (10,153); Terre Haute, Indiana
12/30/1978*	No. 11	Morris Harvey	W 99–63	9–0	34 – Bird	15 – Bird	7 – Reed	Hulman Center (10,184); Terre Haute, Indiana
1/3/1979; HBO	No. 11	Tulsa	W 101–89	10–0 (1–0)	27 – Bird	19 – Bird	6 – Bird	Hulman Center (9,076); Terre Haute, Indiana
1/6/1979	No. 11	at West Texas State	W 98–77	11–0 (2–0)	32 – Bird	20 – Bird	7 – Reed	(4,575); Amarillo, Texas
1/9/1979*	No. 9	North Carolina A&T	W 83–64	12–0	26 – Bird	16 – Bird	7 – Bird	Hulman Center (9,336); Terre Haute, Indiana
1/13/1979	No. 9	Bradley	W 93–74	13–0 (3–0)	27 – Bird	18 – Bird	10 – Bird	Hulman Center (10,037); Terre Haute, Indiana
1/15/1979	No. 9	New Mexico State	W 73–69	14–0 (4–0)	24 – Bird	13 – Bird	6 – 2 Tied	Hulman Center (10,226); Terre Haute, Indiana
1/18/1979; 8:00 p.m.	No. 5	at Wichita State	W 94–84	15–0 (5–0)	31 – Bird	10 – Bird	7 – Nicks	Levitt Arena (10,584); Wichita, Kansas
1/20/1979; 2:35 p.m.	No. 5	at Creighton	W 90–80	16–0 (6–0)	29 – Bird	8 – Bird	9 – Reed	Omaha Civic Auditorium (8,908); Omaha, Nebraska
1/22/1979; 7:35 p.m.	No. 5	Southern Illinois	W 88–79	17–0 (7–0)	31 – Bird	17 – Bird	8 – 2 Tied	Hulman Center (10,291); Terre Haute, Indiana
1/27/1979; 8:00 p.m.	No. 3	Creighton	W 77–69	18–0 (8–0)	17 – Bird	15 – Bird	9 – Bird	Hulman Center (10,229); Terre Haute, Indiana
2/1/1979; 7:35 p.m.	No. 2	at New Mexico State	W 91–89 ^{OT}	19–0 (9–0)	37 – Bird	17 – Bird	9 – Bird	Pan American Center (13,684); Las Cruces, New Mexico
2/3/1979	No. 2	at Tulsa	W 66–56	20–0 (10–0)	22 – Bird	22 – Bird	9 – Nicks	Tulsa Convention Center (8,996); Tulsa, Oklahoma
2/6/1979; 7:35 p.m.	No. 2	Drake	W 100–79	21–0 (11–0)	33 – Bird	10 – Bird	10 – 2 Tied	Hulman Center (10,513); Terre Haute, Indiana
2/10/1979	No. 2	at Bradley	W 91–72	22–0 (12–0)	31 – Nicks	11 – Bird	6 – Nicks	Robertson Memorial Field House (7,300); Peoria, Illinois
2/12/1979	No. 2	West Texas State	W 100–75	23–0 (13–0)	27 – Bird	19 – Bird	7 – Reed	Hulman Center (10,235); Terre Haute, Indiana
2/15/1979; 7:35 p.m.	No. 1	at Southern Illinois	W 69–68	24–0 (14–0)	20 – Bird	13 – Bird	6 – Bird	SIU Arena (10,301); Carbondale, Illinois
2/20/1979	No. 1	at Drake	W 76–68	25–0 (15–0)	27 – Bird	13 – Miley	8 – Reed	Veterans Memorial Auditorium (12,250); Des Moines, Iowa
2/24/1979	No. 1	Wichita State	W 109–84	26–0 (16–0)	49 – Bird	19 – Bird	7 – 2 Tied	Hulman Center (9,579); Terre Haute, Indiana
Missouri Valley Conference tournament
2/27/1979*; 7:30 p.m.	(1) No. 1	(8) West Texas State; MVC Tournament Quarterfinal	W 94–84	27–0	29 – Bird	15 – Bird	9 – Nicks	Hulman Center (10,234); Terre Haute, Indiana
3/1/1979*	(1) No. 1	(5) Southern Illinois; MVC Tournament Semifinal	W 79–72	28–0	25 – Bird	19 – Bird	8 – Reed	Hulman Center (10,274); Terre Haute, Indiana
3/3/1979*	(1) No. 1	(2) New Mexico State; MVC tournament championship	W 69–59	29–0	20 – Bird	10 – Bird	6 – Reed	Hulman Center (10,301); Terre Haute, Indiana
NCAA Tournament
3/11/1979*; NBC	(1 MW) No. 1	vs. (8 MW) Virginia Tech; NCAA second round	W 86–69	30–0	22 – 2 Tied	13 – Bird	7 – Bird	Allen Fieldhouse; Lawrence, Kansas
3/15/1979*; NCAAP	(1 MW) No. 1	vs. (5 MW) No. 16 Oklahoma; NCAA regional semifinal	W 93–72	31–0	29 – Bird	15 – Bird	5 – 2 Tied	Riverfront Coliseum (17,252); Cincinnati, Ohio
3/17/1979*; NBC	(1 MW) No. 1	vs. (2 MW) No. 5 Arkansas; NCAA Regional Final	W 73–71	32–0	31 – Bird	10 – Bird	5 – Reed	Riverfront Coliseum (17,166); Cincinnati, Ohio
3/24/1979*; NBC	(1 MW) No. 1	vs. (2 W) No. 6 DePaul; NCAA Final Four	W 76–74	33–0	35 – Bird	16 – Bird	9 – Bird	Special Events Center (15,410); Salt Lake City, Utah
3/26/1979*; 7:15 p.m., NBC	(1 MW) No. 1	vs. (2 ME) No. 3 Michigan State; NCAA national championship	L 64–75	33–1	19 – Bird	13 – Bird	9 – Reed	Special Events Center (15,410); Salt Lake City, Utah
*Non-conference game. ^{#}Rankings from AP Poll. (#) Tournament seedings in parentheses. MW=Midwest. All times are in Central.

- Source: Schedule

=== NCAA basketball tournament ===
The top seed in the NCAA Midwest Regional was awarded to the Sycamores. The final game of the regional tournament was against Arkansas with a berth in the Final Four on the line. With the game tied at 71, the right-handed Heaton was the hero again with a last second left-handed shot in the lane to win the game. They advanced to the championship game and faced Michigan State University, which was led by sophomore Magic Johnson. In what was the most-watched college basketball game ever, Michigan State defeated Indiana State 75–64, and Johnson was voted Most Outstanding Player of the Final Four.

- West
  - Indiana State (#1 seed) 86, Virginia Tech (#8 seed) 69
  - Indiana State 93, Oklahoma (#5 seed) 72
  - Indiana State 73, Arkansas (#2 seed) 71

- Final Four
  - Indiana State 76, DePaul 74
  - Michigan State 75, Indiana State 64

== Rankings ==
Ranking movements Legend: ██ Increase in ranking ██ Decrease in ranking — = Not ranked
	Week																
Poll	Pre	1	2	3	4	5	6	7	8	9	10	11	12	13	14	15	Final
AP	—	—	—	20	16	11	11	9	5	3	2	2	1	2	1	1	1
Coaches	—	—	—	16	15	11	9	9	5	3	2	2	2	2	1	1	Not released

^Coaches did not release Week 1 or Week 2 polls.

== Awards and honors ==
- Larry Bird, Consensus All-American teams
- Larry Bird, All-Missouri Valley Conference
- Larry Bird – AP, UPI, USBWA, The Sporting News, Basketball Weekly All-American selections
- Larry Bird, Missouri Valley Conference Most Valuable Player
- Larry Bird – 1979 Oscar Robertson Trophy, Naismith Award, John R. Wooden Award, Adolph Rupp Trophy, AP Player of the Year, Eastman Award
- Bill Hodges, NCAA Coach of the Year
