= Ron Charles (basketball) =

American basketball player (1959–2024)

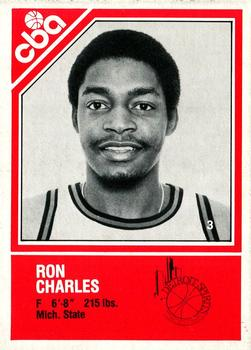

Personal information
- Born: January 23, 1959 New York City, New York, U.S.
- Died: July 21, 2024 (aged 65) Atlanta, Georgia, U.S.
- Listed height: 6 ft 7 in (2.01 m)
- Listed weight: 215 lb (98 kg)

Career information
- College: Michigan State (1976–1980)
- NBA draft: 1980: 4th round, 74th overall pick
- Drafted by: Chicago Bulls
- Position: Power forward / center

Career history
- 1981–1982: Caja de Ronda
- 1982–1983: Detroit Spirits
- 1987: Segafredo Gorizia

Career highlights
- CBA champion (1983); NCAA champion (1979)
- Stats at Basketball Reference

Ronald Alexander Charles (January 23, 1959 – July 21, 2024) was an American basketball player. He was a member of Michigan State's 1979 national championship team and played professionally in many leagues, including Italy's Lega Basket Serie A. Charles died suddenly at his home in Atlanta on July 21, 2024, at the age of 65.

== College career ==
Charles, a 6 ft 7 in (2.01 m) forward and center from the United States Virgin Islands played collegiate basketball at Michigan State University from 1976 to 1980. In his sophomore and junior seasons, Charles was a key contributor for the Spartans' back-to-back Big Ten championship teams, led by future Hall of Famer Magic Johnson. In the 1978–79 season, Charles was sixth man for the Spartans squad as they won the 1979 NCAA Tournament. Charles stepped into the starting lineup after Spartans sophomore Jay Vincent injured his foot and started for most of the NCAA tournament. He led the Spartans in field goal percentage that season, shooting .665 from the floor, establishing a school record for a season in the process.

As a senior, Charles was named a co-captain of the 1979–80 Spartans and entered the starting line-up full-time. While the team had a letdown after losing Johnson and Greg Kelser, Charles had a successful individual season. He broke his own record for season field goal percentage, shooting .676 from the floor, including a 12 for 12 shooting night against rival Michigan to tie the school record for single-game FG percentage as well. For the season, Charles averaged 8.9 rebounds per game. He ended his career holding all school records for field goal percentage, for a game, season and career (.639).

== Professional career ==
Following his college career, Charles was drafted by the Chicago Bulls in the 1980 NBA draft (4th round, 74th pick). He played professionally for several years, including stints in the Continental Basketball Association, Spain, Portugal, Italy, and France. Charles won a CBA championship with the Detroit Spirits in 1983. He returned to the U. S. in 1989, settling in Atlanta.
