= Bill Hodges =

American basketball coach (born 1943)

Biographical details
- Born: March 9, 1943 (age 83); Zionsville, Indiana, U.S.
- Education: Purdue University

Coaching career (HC unless noted)
- 1965–1966: Marian (assistant)
- 1970–1974: Tennessee Tech (assistant)
- 1974–1975: Armstrong State (assistant)
- 1975–1978: Indiana State (assistant)
- 1978–1982: Indiana State
- 1983–1984: Long Beach State (assistant)
- 1986–1991: Georgia College
- 1991–1997: Mercer
- 1998–1999: Murray State (assistant)

Head coaching record
- Overall: 239–208
- Tournaments: 4–1 (NCAA Division I); 0–3 (NAIA)

Accomplishments and honors

Championships
- NCAA Division I Regional – Final Four (1979); MVC regular season (1979); MVC tournament (1979)

Awards
- MVC Coach of the Year (1979); AP Coach of the Year (1979); UPI Coach of the Year (1979); Sporting News Coach of the Year (1979)

William Oscar Hodges (born March 9, 1943) is an American former basketball coach. He was the head basketball coach for the Indiana State Sycamores from 1978 to 1982, at Georgia College and State University from 1986 to 1991 and at Mercer University from 1991 to 1997.

== Career ==
As an assistant basketball coach at Indiana State University, he recruited Larry Bird after Bird had dropped out of Indiana University. Before the start of the 1978–79 season, Hodges was hired as Head Coach at Indiana State University after head coach Bob King suffered a brain aneurysm. Hodges proceeded to lead Indiana State with Larry Bird to an undefeated regular season and a second-place finish in the 1979 NCAA Division I men's basketball tournament, losing to Michigan State University and Magic Johnson in the NCAA Final. During that year, after a 33–1 record, Hodges won several coach of the year awards, including the UPI's and AP's. The Sycamores were selected as the United Press International Collegiate Champions. His later Indiana State teams would never reach the same heights, leading to his resignation from Indiana State after the 1982 season.

Hodges is currently #7 in coaching wins at Indiana State with a record of 67–48 (.583) and #5 in wins at Mercer with a record of 62–107 (.367). His record at Georgia College was 110–53 (.675). His overall collegiate head coaching record is 239–208 (.535). Hodges is a graduate of Purdue University.

Moving to live near his daughter, Hodges returned to high school teaching and coaching to keep busy and coach his granddaughter. He coached the boys basketball teams Roanoke Catholic High School and North Cross School in Roanoke, Virginia from 2011 to 2013, where he led North Cross to the VISAA state tournament where they upset Carlisle School in the semifinals and went on to play for the state title, but came up just short. He then coached the girls team at The Villages Charter High School in The Villages, Florida as of the 2016–17 season.

== Personal ==
Hodges also coached golf at Armstrong Atlantic State University before moving to Indiana State. He is a Vietnam-era veteran of the United States Air Force.

Inducted in 1999, Hodges is a member of the Indiana State University Athletic Hall of Fame as part of the 1978–79 men's basketball team.

In 2019, Hodges was inducted into the Indiana State University Athletic Hall of Fame individually.

== Head coaching record ==
Record table
Season	Team	Overall	Conference	Standing	Postseason
Indiana State Sycamores (Missouri Valley Conference) (1979–1982)
1978–79	Indiana State	33–1	16–0	1st	NCAA Division I Runner-up
1979–80	Indiana State	16–11	8–8	T–5th	
1980–81	Indiana State	9–18	4–12	8th	
1981–82	Indiana State	9–18	2–14	T–9th	
Indiana State:		67–48	30–34		
Georgia College Bobcats (Peach Belt Conference) (1986–1991)
1986–87	Georgia College	17–14			
1987–88	Georgia College	25–9			NAIA First Round
1988–89	Georgia College	25–10			NAIA First Round
1989–90	Georgia College	24–8			NAIA First Round
1990–91	Georgia College	19–12	6–6	T–3rd	
Georgia College:		110–53			
Mercer Bears (Trans America Athletic Conference) (1991–1997)
1991–92	Mercer	11–18	6–8	T–5th	
1992–93	Mercer	13–14	7–5	T–2nd	
1993–94	Mercer	5–24	3–14	9th	
1994–95	Mercer	15–14	8–8	4th	
1995–96	Mercer	15–14	7–9	4th (West)	
1996–97	Mercer	3–23	1–15	6th (West)	
Mercer:		62–107	32–59		
Total:		239–208			
National champion Postseason invitational champion Conference regular season champion Conference regular season and conference tournament champion Division regular season champion Division regular season and conference tournament champion Conference tournament champion

== See also ==
- List of NCAA Division I men's basketball tournament Final Four appearances by coach
