= Terry Donnelly =

Canadian journalist

Terry Donnelly is a Canadian journalist working for CBC Radio One's British Columbia newsroom in Vancouver.

Donnelly first worked for the CBC in 1976, before graduating from the British Columbia Institute of Technology in 1977. He has also filled in as a news reader and show host.

He has been recognized for his work over his career, winning awards from the BC region of Radio and Television News Directors Association in 1991 and 2007. Donnelly also won the Best Radio Reporting honour at the 1992 Jack Webster Awards.

In 2006, Donnelly was named "Mentor of the Year" at CBC Vancouver.
