= Larry Bird =

American basketball player (born 1956)

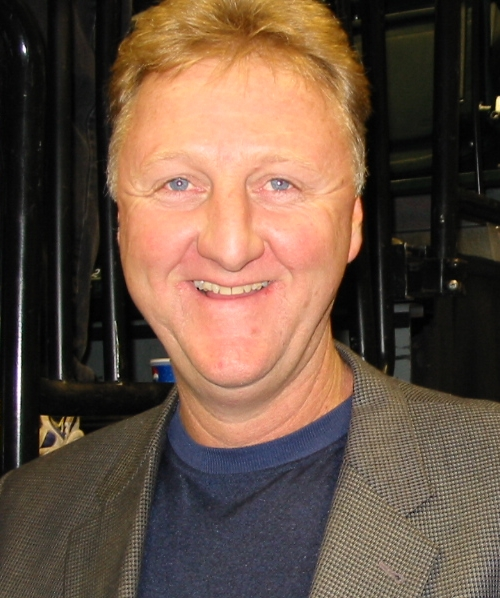
- Bird in 2004

Indiana Pacers
- Title: Consultant
- League: NBA

Personal information
- Born: December 7, 1956 (age 69) West Baden Springs, Indiana, U.S.
- Listed height: 6 ft 9 in (2.06 m)
- Listed weight: 220 lb (100 kg)

Career information
- High school: Springs Valley (French Lick, Indiana)
- College: Indiana State (1976–1979)
- NBA draft: 1978: 1st round, 6th overall pick
- Drafted by: Boston Celtics
- Playing career: 1979–1992
- Position: Small forward / power forward
- Number: 33
- Coaching career: 1997–2000

Career history

Playing
- 1979–1992: Boston Celtics

Coaching
- 1997–2000: Indiana Pacers

Career highlights
- As player: 3× NBA champion (1981, 1984, 1986); 2× NBA Finals MVP (1984, 1986); 3× NBA Most Valuable Player (1984–1986); 12× NBA All-Star (1980–1988, 1990–1992); NBA All-Star Game MVP (1982); 9× All-NBA First Team (1980–1988); All-NBA Second Team (1990); 3× NBA All-Defensive Second Team (1982–1984); NBA Rookie of the Year (1980); NBA All-Rookie Team (1980); 3× NBA Three-Point Contest champion (1986–1988); AP Athlete of the Year (1986); NBA anniversary team (50th, 75th); No. 33 retired by Boston Celtics; National College Player of the Year (1979); 2× Consensus first-team All-American (1978, 1979); Third-team All-American – NABC, UPI (1977); 2× MVC Player of the Year (1978, 1979); 2× First-team All-MVC (1978, 1979); No. 33 retired by Indiana State Sycamores; As coach: NBA Coach of the Year (1998); NBA All-Star Game head coach (1998); As executive: NBA Executive of the Year (2012)

Career NBA playing statistics
- Points: 21,791 (24.3 ppg)
- Rebounds: 8,974 (10.0 rpg)
- Assists: 5,695 (6.3 apg)
- Stats at NBA.com
- Stats at Basketball Reference

Career coaching record
- NBA: 147–67 (.687)
- Record at Basketball Reference
- Basketball Hall of Fame
- Collegiate Basketball Hall of Fame
Medals
Men's basketball
Representing the United States
Olympic Games
Gold medal – first place	1992 Barcelona	Men's Basketball
FIBA Americas Championship
Gold medal – first place	1992 Portland	Men's basketball
World University Games
Gold medal – first place	1977 Sofia	Men's Basketball

Larry Joe Bird (born December 7, 1956) is an American former professional basketball player, coach, and executive in the National Basketball Association (NBA). Nicknamed "the Hick from French Lick" and "Larry Legend", Bird is widely regarded as one of the greatest basketball players of all time. He is the only person in NBA history to be named Rookie of the Year, Most Valuable Player, Finals MVP, All-Star MVP, Coach of the Year, and Executive of the Year.

Growing up in French Lick, Indiana, Bird was a local basketball star. Highly recruited, he initially signed to play college basketball for Indiana University Bloomington. However, he dropped out after one month and returned to French Lick to attend a local college. The next year, he attended Indiana State University, ultimately playing three years for the Sycamores. Bird was selected by the Boston Celtics as the sixth overall pick in the 1978 NBA draft after his second year at Indiana State, but he elected to stay in college for the 1978–79 season. He led Indiana State to an undefeated regular season and a berth in the national championship, where they faced Michigan State and Magic Johnson, a match-up which launched a career-long rivalry between the two players.

Bird entered the NBA for the 1979–80 season, where he made an immediate impact, leading the Celtics to a 32-win improvement over the previous season. Bird played for the Celtics during his entire 13-season professional career, leading them to five NBA Finals appearances and three NBA championships. He played most of his career with forward Kevin McHale and center Robert Parish, considered by some to be the greatest front court in NBA history. Bird was a 12-time NBA All-Star, won two NBA Finals MVP awards and received the NBA Most Valuable Player Award three consecutive times (1984–1986), making him the only forward in league history to do so. Bird was also a member of the gold medal-winning 1992 U.S. Olympic basketball team, known as the "Dream Team". He was inducted into the Naismith Memorial Basketball Hall of Fame twice as a player—first in 1998 as an individual, and again in 2010 as a member of the "Dream Team". Bird was voted onto the NBA's 50 Greatest Players in NBA History list in 1996, and subsequently the 75th Anniversary Team list in 2021. A versatile player at both forward positions, Bird could play both inside and outside, being one of the first players in the league to take advantage of the newly adopted three-point line. He was rated the greatest NBA small forward of all time by Fox Sports in 2016.

After retiring as a player, Bird served as head coach of the Indiana Pacers from 1997 to 2000. He was named NBA Coach of the Year for the 1997–98 season and later led the Pacers to a berth in the 2000 NBA Finals. In 2003, Bird was named president of basketball operations for the Pacers, holding the position until retiring in 2012. He was named NBA Executive of the Year for the 2012 season. Bird returned to the Pacers as president of basketball operations in 2013, and remained in that role until 2017. Bird continued with the Pacers as an advisor until July 2022, then after nearly a year's break returned to the organization in the role of consultant.

== Early life ==
Bird was born December 7, 1956, in West Baden Springs, Indiana, to Georgia Marie (née Kerns; 1930–1996) and Claude Joseph "Joe" Bird (1926–1975), a veteran of World War II and the Korean War. His parents were of Irish, Scottish and Native American descent. Bird has four brothers and a sister.

Bird was raised in nearby French Lick, where his mother worked two jobs to support Larry and his five siblings. Bird has said that being poor as a child still motivates him "to this day." Georgia and Joe divorced when Larry was in high school, and Joe committed suicide in February 1975.

Bird used basketball as an escape from his family troubles, starring for Springs Valley High School (Class of 1974) and averaging 31 points, 21 rebounds, and 4.0 assists as a senior on his way to becoming the school's all-time scoring leader. Bird wore the jersey number 33 in high school because his brother Mark had previously had it; he kept that number through his college and professional career. According to Bird, he grew up as a huge fan of the Indiana Pacers in the American Basketball Association (ABA) and center Mel Daniels, who represented his first exposure to professional basketball. Daniels would coincidentally become an assistant coach to Bird at Indiana State University.

== College career ==
Bird received a scholarship to play college basketball for the Indiana Hoosiers under head coach Bob Knight in 1974. After less than a month on the Indiana University Bloomington campus, Bird dropped out of school, finding the adjustment between his small hometown and the large student population of Bloomington to be overwhelming. Bird returned to French Lick, enrolling at Northwood Institute (now Northwood University) in nearby West Baden, and working municipal jobs for a year before enrolling at Indiana State University in Terre Haute in 1975. He had a successful three-year career with the Sycamores, helping them reach the NCAA tournament for the first time in school history with a 33–0 record where they played the 1979 championship game against Michigan State. Indiana State lost the game 75–64, with Bird scoring 19 points but making only 7 of 21 shots.

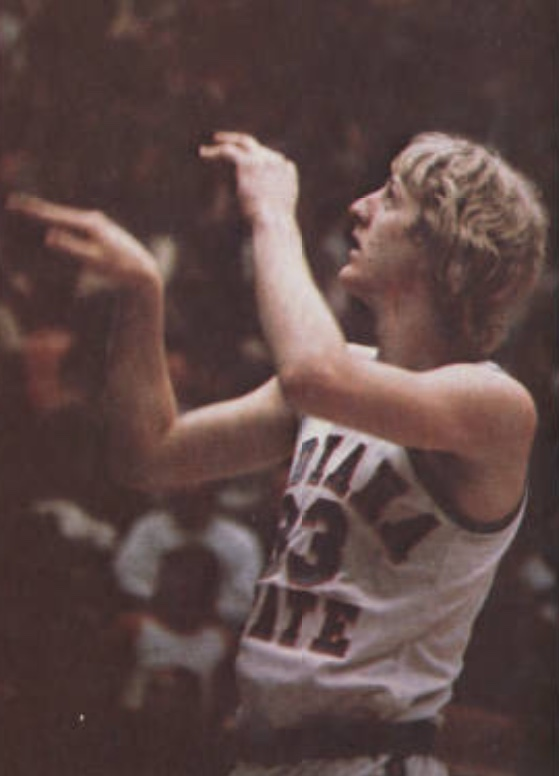
Bird warming up for Indiana State c. 1976–77

The game achieved the highest-ever television rating for a college basketball game, in large part because of the matchup between Bird and Spartans' point guard Earvin "Magic" Johnson, a rivalry that lasted throughout their professional careers. Despite failing to win the championship, Bird earned numerous year-end awards and honors for his outstanding play, including the Naismith College Player of the Year Award. For his college career, Bird averaged 30.3 points, 13.3 rebounds, and 4.6 assists per game, leading the Sycamores to an 81–13 record during his tenure. Bird also appeared in one game for the baseball team, going 1–for–2 with two runs batted in. He graduated in 1979 with a Bachelor of Science degree in physical education. Bird's youngest brother, Eddie, also played basketball at Indiana State.

== Professional career ==
=== Boston Celtics (1979–1992) ===
==== Joining the Celtics (1978–1979) ====
Bird was selected by the Boston Celtics with the sixth overall pick in the 1978 NBA draft. He did not sign with the Celtics immediately; instead, Bird played out his final season at Indiana State and led the Sycamores to the NCAA title game. Celtics general manager Red Auerbach publicly stated that he would not pay Bird more than any Celtic on the current roster, but Bird's agent Bob Woolf told Auerbach that Bird would reject any sub-market offers and simply enter the 1979 draft instead, where Boston's rights would expire when the draft began on June 25, and Bird would have been the likely top pick. After protracted negotiations, he signed a five-year, $3.25 million contract with the team on June 8, making Bird the highest-paid rookie in sports history. Shortly afterwards, NBA draft eligibility rules were changed to prevent teams from drafting players before they were ready to sign, a rule known as the Bird Collegiate Rule.

==== Early success (1979–1983) ====
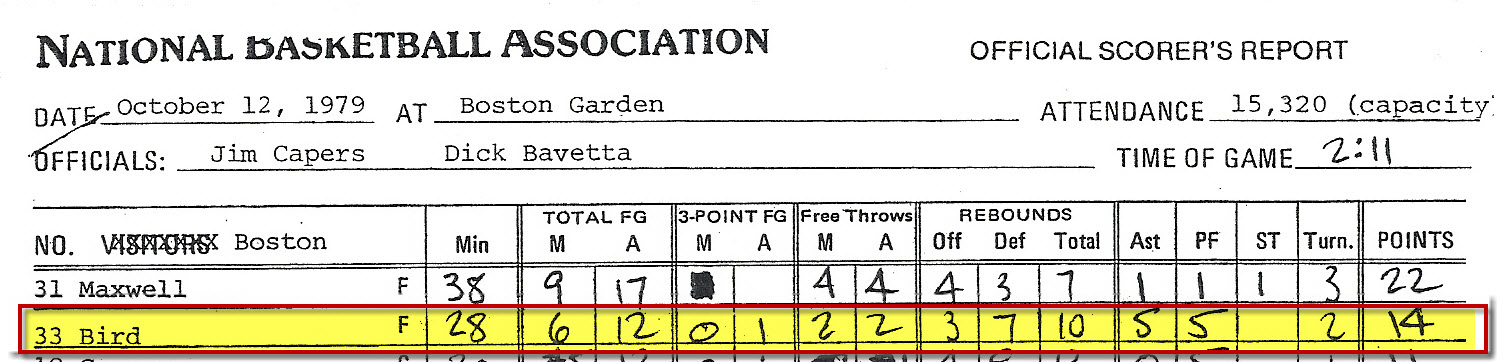
Bird recorded 14 points, 10 rebounds, and five assists in his NBA debut against the Houston Rockets on October 12, 1979.

In his rookie season (1979–80), Bird immediately transformed the Celtics into a title contender. The team improved its win total by 32 games from the year before he was drafted and finished first in the Eastern Conference. In his career debut, Bird recorded 14 points, 10 rebounds, and five assists in a 114–106 victory over the Houston Rockets. On November 14, 1979, he recorded his first career triple-double with 23 points, 19 rebounds and 10 assists in a 115–111 victory over the Detroit Pistons. Nine days later, Bird recorded his first 30-point scoring game (along with 11 rebounds and 3 assists) in a 118–103 victory over the Indiana Pacers. With averages of 21.3 points, 10.4 rebounds, 4.5 assists, and 1.7 steals per game for the season, he was selected to the All-Star Team and named Rookie of the Year. In the Eastern Conference Finals, Boston was eliminated by the Philadelphia 76ers. By the end of his rookie year, Celtics season-ticket sales had increased from 4,800 to roughly 10,000.

Before the 1980–81 season, the Celtics selected forward Kevin McHale in the draft and acquired center Robert Parish from the Golden State Warriors, forming a Hall of Fame trio for years to come; the front-court of Bird, McHale, and Parish is regarded as one of the greatest front-courts in NBA history. Behind Bird's leadership and Boston's upgraded roster, the Celtics again advanced to the Conference Finals for a rematch with the 76ers. Boston fell behind 3–1 to start the series but won the next three games to advance to the Finals against the Houston Rockets, winning in six games and earning Bird his first championship. Bird averaged 21.9 points, 14 rebounds, 6.1 assists, and 2.3 steals per game for the postseason and 15.3 points, 15.3 rebounds, and 7 assists per game for the Finals.

At the 1982 All-Star Game, Bird scored 19 points en route to winning the All-Star Game MVP Award. At the end of the season, he earned his first All-Defensive Team selection. Bird eventually finished runner-up in Most Valuable Player Award voting to Moses Malone. That year Bird averaged 22.9 points, 10.9 rebounds, 5.8 assists and 1.9 steals per game. In the Conference Finals, the Celtics faced the 76ers for the third consecutive year, losing in seven games. Boston's misfortunes continued into the next season, with Bird again finishing second in MVP voting to Malone and the team losing in the conference semifinals to the Milwaukee Bucks. However, his numbers once again went up, averaging 23.6 points, 11.0 rebounds and 5.8 assists.

==== MVP three-peat (1983–1986) ====
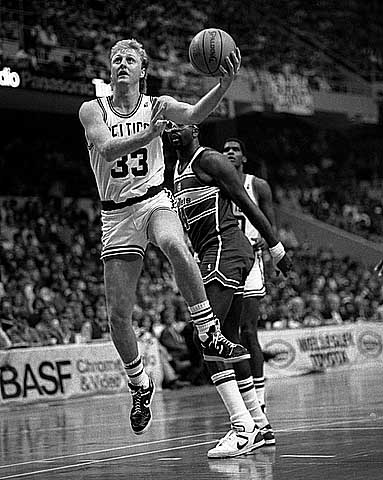
Bird in a game against the Washington Bullets

Bird was slated to become a free agent after the 1983–84 season. In 1983, as part of a collective bargaining agreement, the NBA initially implemented a "hard" salary cap (meaning total player salaries could not exceed a certain limit) which would not go into effect until the 1984–85 season. The NBA quickly modified this to a "soft cap", meaning the cap could be exceeded in order for a team to re-sign its own free agents. This came to be erroneously known as the "Larry Bird Rule"; the Celtics didn't actually invoke the exception to specifically re-sign Bird, as the cap wasn't in effect. Bird signed his seven-year, $12.6 million extension in 1983, before the cap came into effect and the Celtics were actually over the cap in total player salaries (including Bird's extension) at the time the cap was implemented.

Bird was named MVP of the 1983–84 season with averages of 24.2 points, 10.1 rebounds, 6.6 assists, and 1.8 steals per game. In the playoffs, the Celtics avenged their loss from the year before to the Bucks, winning in five games in the Conference Finals to advance to the Finals against the Los Angeles Lakers. In Game 4, the Lakers—led by Bird's college rival Magic Johnson—were on the verge of taking a commanding 3–1 series lead before a flagrant foul was committed on Kurt Rambis that resulted in a brawl and caused the Lakers to lose their composure. Boston came back to win that game and eventually won the series in seven games. Bird was named Finals MVP behind 27.4 points, 14 rebounds, and 3.6 assists per game.

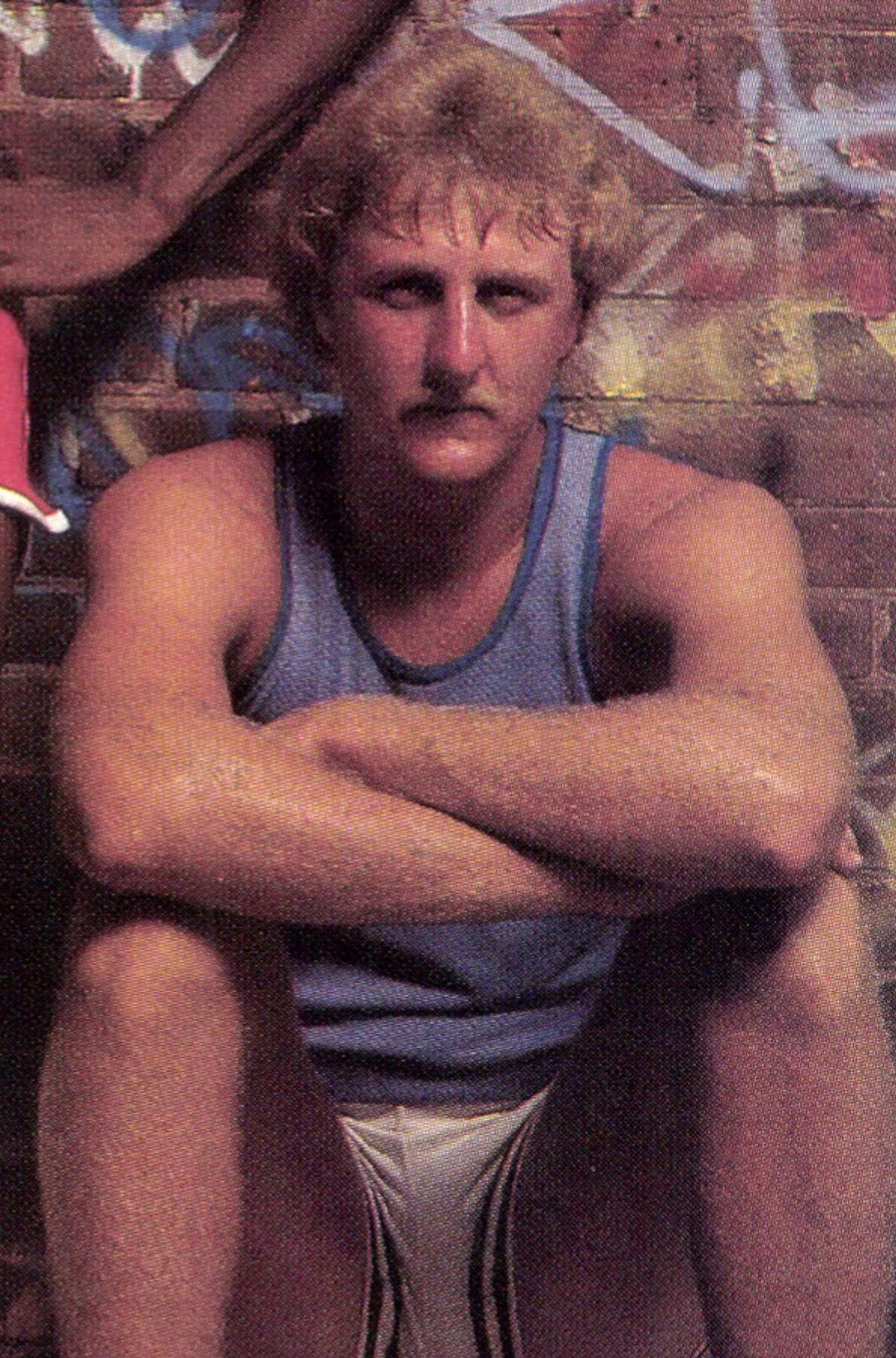
Bird in 1983

On December 9, 1984, Bird recorded 48 points to go along with 14 rebounds and 5 assists in a narrow 128–127 victory over the Atlanta Hawks. On March 12 of the 1984–85 season, Bird scored a career-high and franchise record 60 points in a game against the Atlanta Hawks. The performance came just nine days after Kevin McHale set the previous Celtics record for points in a game with 56. At the end of the year, Bird was named MVP for the second consecutive season, behind averages of 28.7 points, 10.5 rebounds, and 6.6 assists per game. Boston advanced through the playoffs to earn a rematch with the Lakers, this time losing in six games. During game five of the Eastern Conference semifinals, Bird scored his playoff career-high 43 points against the Detroit Pistons in a Celtics 130–123 win.

During the 1985 offseason, Bird injured his back shoveling crushed rock to create a driveway at his mother's house. At least partially as a result of this, Bird experienced back problems for the rest of his career.

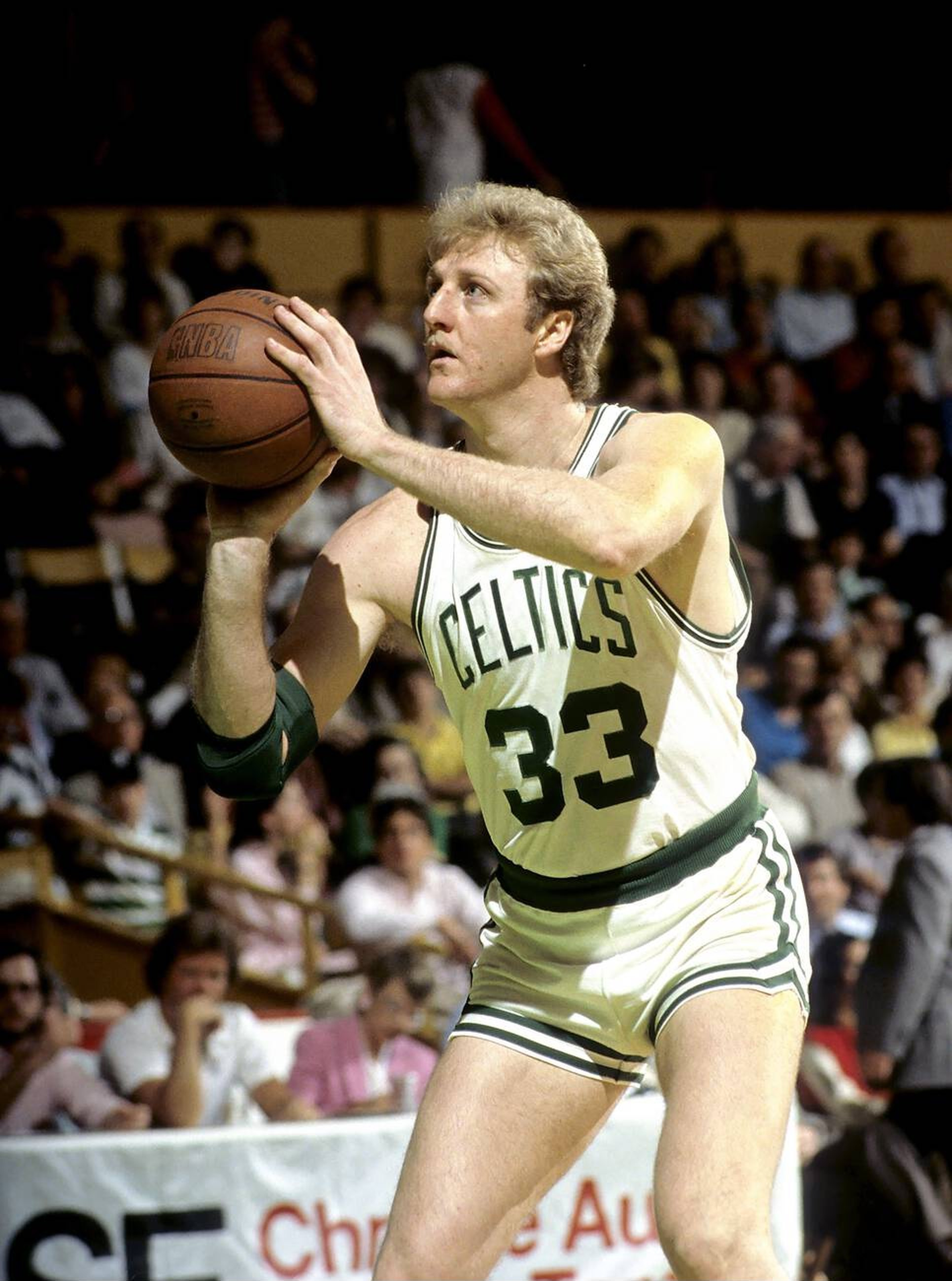
Bird playing for the Celtics in the 1985 NBA playoffs

Before the start of the 1985–86 season, the Celtics made a daring trade for Bill Walton, an All-Star center with a history of injury. The risk paid off; Walton's acquisition helped Boston win a league best 67 games. One of Bird's career highlights occurred at the 1986 NBA All-Star Weekend when he walked into the locker room at the inaugural Three-Point Shootout and asked who was going to finish second before winning the shootout.

On November 27, 1985, Bird recorded 47 points to go along with 12 rebounds, two assists, and two steals in a 132–124 victory over the Detroit Pistons. On March 10, 1986, he scored 50 points to go along with 11 rebounds and five assists in a narrow 116–115 loss to the Dallas Mavericks.

With averages of 25.8 points, 9.8 rebounds, and 6.8 assists, and 2.0 steals per game, Bird became just the third player in NBA history to win three consecutive MVP Awards. In the playoffs, the Celtics lost only one game through the first three rounds en route to a match-up against the Rockets in the Finals. In Game 6 of the Finals against the Rockets, Bird recorded a triple-double of 29 points, 11 rebounds, and 12 assists as the Celtics won the Finals in six games. He averaged 24 points, 9.7 rebounds, and 9.5 assists per game for the championship round.

The 1985–86 Celtics are commonly ranked as one of the greatest basketball teams of all time, with the Boston Globe's Peter May and Grantland's Bill Simmons listing them at number one.

==== Falling short (1986–1988) ====
In 1987, the Celtics made their last Finals appearance of Bird's career, fighting through difficult series against the Milwaukee Bucks and Detroit Pistons. In Game 5 of the Eastern Conference Finals against the Pistons, with five seconds remaining in the fourth quarter and Boston trailing the Pistons 107–106, Bird stole an inbound pass. Falling out of bounds, Bird turned and passed the ball to teammate Dennis Johnson, who converted a game-winning layup with less than a second left. The dramatic play saved the series for the Celtics. In the Finals, the Celtics faced a dominant Lakers team that had won 65 games during the season. The Celtics ended up losing to the Lakers in six games, with Bird averaging 24.2 points on .445 shooting, 10 rebounds, and 5.5 assists per game.

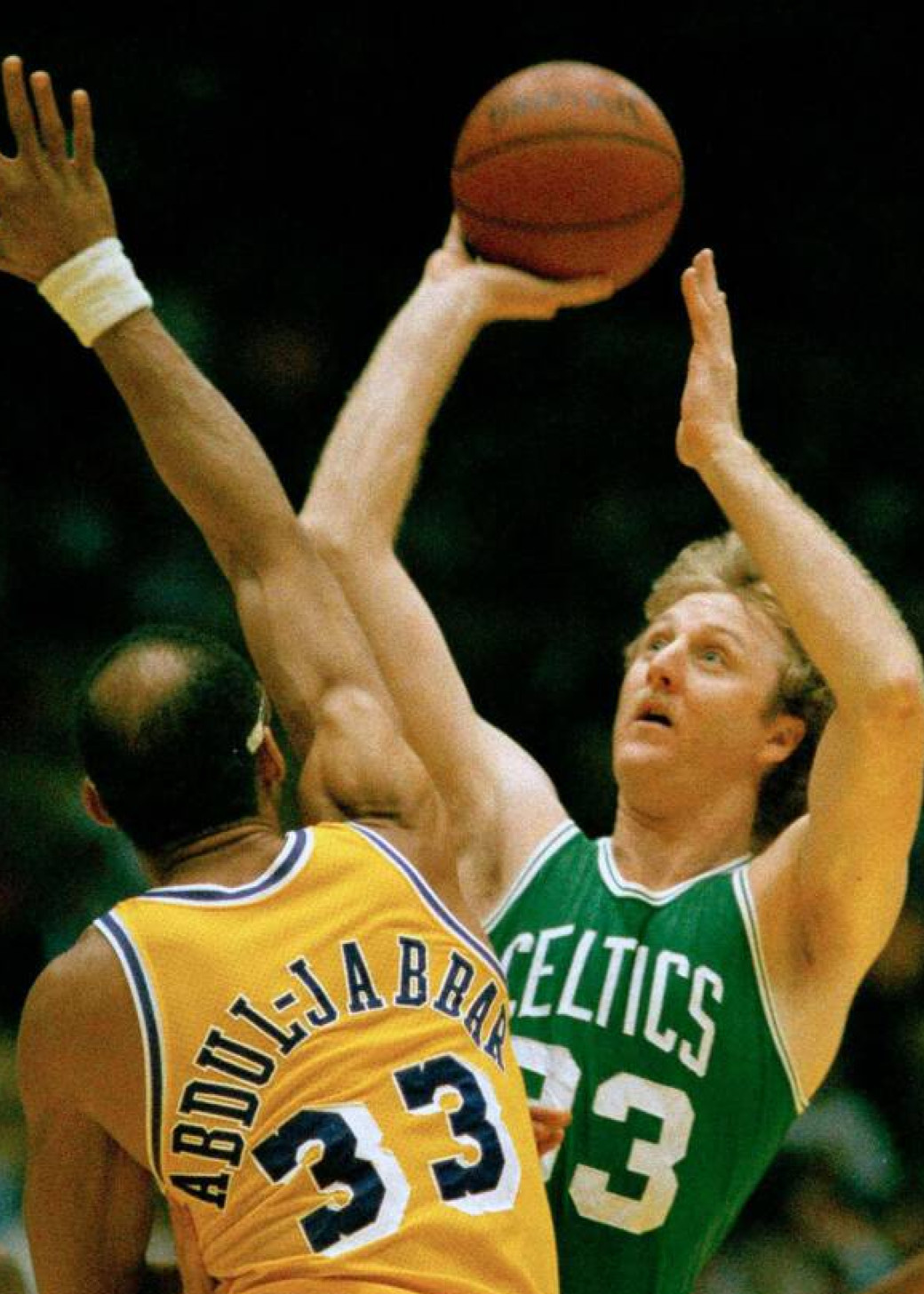
Bird being marked by Kareem Abdul-Jabbar in a Celtics v Lakers game of the 1980s

The 1987–88 season was the highest-scoring season of Bird's career. Aided by a new weight training regimen along with a shorter hairstyle after years of sporting a mullet, Bird would average nearly 30 points on 53% shooting, as the Celtics topped the Eastern Conference with 57 wins. In Game 7 of the 1988 Eastern Conference Semifinals against the Atlanta Hawks, Bird shot 9-of-10 from the floor in the fourth quarter, scoring 20 points in that quarter and lifting the Celtics to a series-clinching victory. Bird finished with 34 points. His effort helped to overcome a 47-point performance by Atlanta's Dominique Wilkins. Wilkins remarked, "The basket was like a well. I couldn't miss. He couldn't miss. And it went down to the last shot of the game. Who was going to make the last shot? That's the greatest game I've ever played in or seen played." The Celtics failed to reach the NBA Finals for the first time in five years, losing to the Pistons in six games during the Eastern Conference Finals. Throughout the year Bird, averaged 29.9 points, 9.3 rebounds and 6.1 assists, finishing second in MVP voting to Michael Jordan.

Between them, Bird and Johnson captured eight NBA championships during the 1980s, with Magic getting five and Bird three. During the 1980s, either Boston or Los Angeles appeared in every NBA Finals.

==== Late career (1988–1992) ====
Bird's 1988–89 season ended after six games when he had bone spurs surgically removed from both of his heels. Bird returned to the Celtics in 1989, but debilitating back problems and an aging Celtic roster prevented him from regaining his prime form. Nonetheless, during the final years of his career, Bird maintained his status as one of the premier players in the game. In his final three seasons with the Celtics, Bird averaged over 20 points, nine rebounds, and seven assists per game, shot better than 45% from the field, and led the Celtics to playoff appearances.

After leading the Celtics to a 29–5 start to the 1990–91 season, Bird missed 22 games due to a compressed nerve root in his back, a condition that eventually led to his retirement. Bird had off-season surgery to remove a disc from his back, but his back problems continued and Bird missed 37 games during the 1991–92 season. During the 1992 Eastern Conference Semifinals against the Cleveland Cavaliers, Bird missed four of the seven games due to recurring back problems.

During Bird's final two seasons when he had serious back problems, the Celtics went 71–28 when he played. Without Bird, they had a 30–29 record, further demonstrating his importance and game-changing ability while on the court.

On August 18, 1992, Bird announced his retirement from the NBA. Following Bird's departure, the Celtics held a retirement party for him at the sold-out Boston Garden on February 4, 1993, dubbed "Larry Bird Night" where they retired his number 33. The Los Angeles Times dubbed the event "the basketball equivalent of a Kennedy wedding."

== Rivalry with Magic Johnson ==
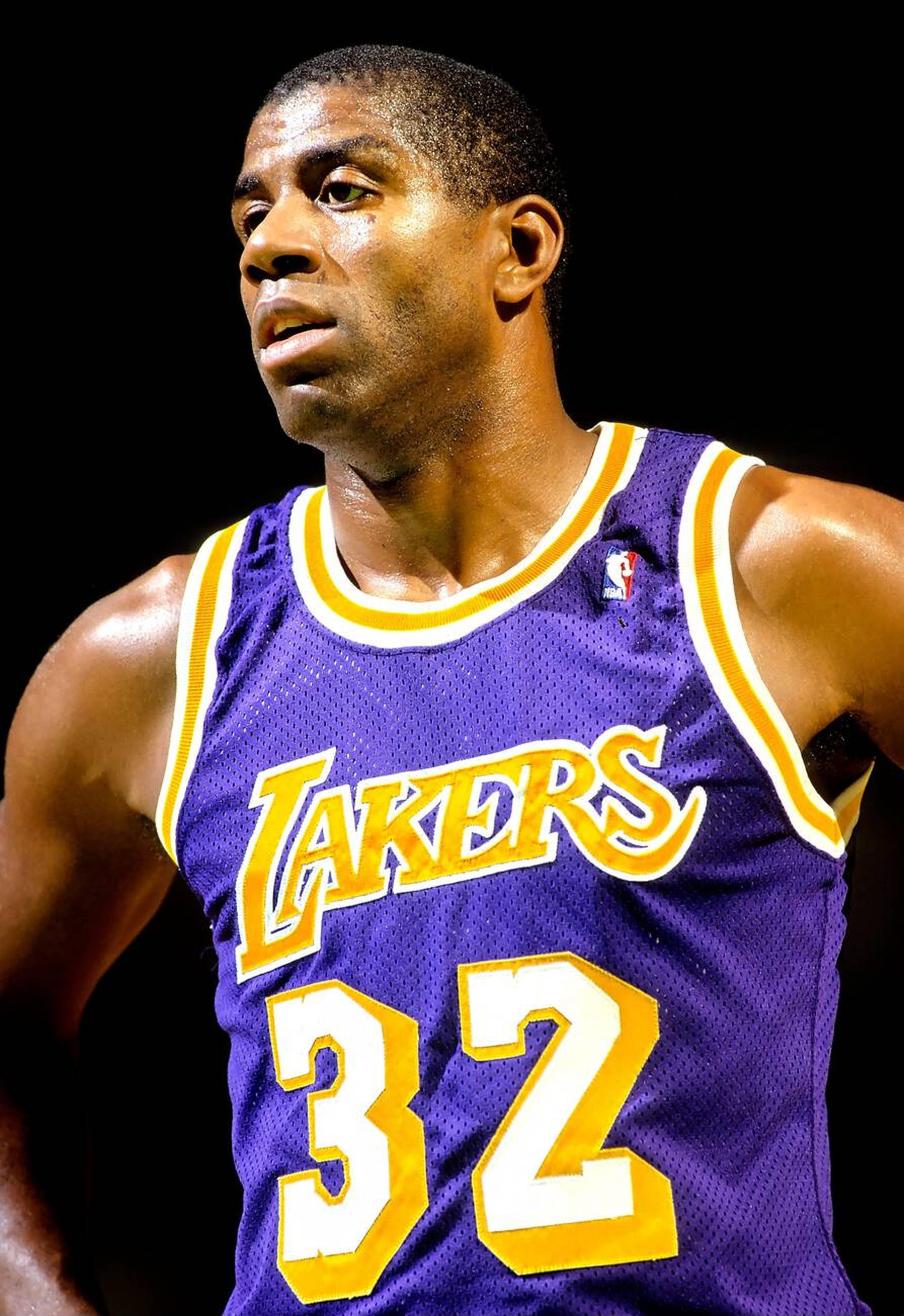
Bird's rivalry with Magic Johnson (pictured) is often credited with popularizing the NBA.

Larry Bird and Magic Johnson are known to be "one of the greatest rivalries in sports." Their rivalry began in college, when Bird and Indiana State lost to Johnson and Michigan State in the NCAA Championship game. Their rivalry continued on in the revived Celtics–Lakers rivalry in the NBA. Either the Celtics, led by Bird, or the Lakers, led by Magic, were present in every NBA Finals series in the '80s, with Bird and Magic meeting thrice. Magic defeated Bird in 1985 and 1987, while Bird defeated Magic in 1984.

Throughout the 1980s, contests between the Celtics and the Lakers—both during the regular season and in the Finals—attracted large television audiences. The first regular-season game between the Celtics and the Lakers in the 1987–88 season had Johnson banking in an off-balance shot from near the three-point line at the buzzer for a narrow 115–114 Lakers victory at Boston Garden. The historical rift between the teams, which faced each other several times in championship series of the 1960s, fueled fan interest in the rivalry. The rivalry between the two players changed the landscape of the NBA, transforming it from a "struggling, barely profitable league into a highly visible, financial and marketing dream for teams and players alike." The emergence of the two players was recognized with the rise in popularity of the NBA, as the NBA started to market towards them.

The apparent contrast between the two players and their respective teams was noted. Bird was White, Johnson was Black; Bird was an introvert from a small town playing in blue-collar Boston, while Johnson was the gregarious personification of the glitz and glamour of Los Angeles; Bird's Celtics played gritty, physical, defense-first basketball, whereas Johnson ran the Lakers' fast-paced Showtime offense. A 1980s Converse commercial for its "Weapon" line of basketball shoes (endorsed by both Bird and Johnson) reflected the perceived dichotomy between the two players. In the commercial, Bird is practicing alone on a rural basketball court (in reality the court was one Bird had made on the property in French Lick that he had purchased for his mother), when Johnson pulls up in a sleek limousine and challenges him to a one-on-one match.

Journalists speculated that Bird and Magic represented different contrasts, such as clashes between Celtics and Lakers, between East and West, and between Blacks and Whites. One journalist said, "They looked different, perhaps, but take a chainsaw to their souls and they were fraternal, if not identical, friends." Watching Bird play was like watching Magic play, as they both shared this talent that the league had never seen before being recognized for their charisma, deft shooting touch, passing skills, and team-oriented mindset that ignited their team and the crowd. This style of play was starting to influence a new horde of fans as they would sit and "marvel at what they [Bird and Magic] can do" while giving younger kids "a different perspective of the game."

Despite the intensity of their rivalry, Bird and Johnson became friends off the court. Their friendship blossomed when the two players worked together to film the Converse commercial, which depicted them as archenemies. Johnson appeared at Bird's retirement ceremony on February 4, 1993, and emotionally described Bird as a "friend forever."

== National team career ==
During the summer of 1992, Bird joined Magic Johnson, Michael Jordan, and other NBA stars to play for the United States men's national basketball team in that year's Olympics in Barcelona, Spain. It was the first time in the United States' Olympic history that the country sent NBA players to compete. Although head coach Chuck Daly initially suggested that Jordan captain the team, he declined and so Bird and Magic Johnson had co-captaincy of the 1992 United States men's Olympic basketball team.

The "Dream Team" won the men's basketball gold medal. In eight games, Bird averaged 8.4 points. The Naismith Memorial Basketball Hall of Fame called the team "the greatest collection of basketball talent on the planet."

== Player profile ==
Bird has been described as one of the greatest basketball players and greatest shooters of all time. He was selected to 12 NBA All-Star teams. Bird won three NBA championships (in 1981, 1984, and 1986) with the Celtics and won two NBA Finals MVP Awards. He won three consecutive regular season MVP awards; as of 2020, the only other players to accomplish this feat are Bill Russell and Wilt Chamberlain. Bird was also a four-time regular season MVP runner-up in 1981, 1982, 1983, and 1988.

Bird scored 24.3 points per game in his career on a .496 field goal percentage, an .886 free throw percentage, and a .376 percentage on three-point shots. Bird had an average of 10.0 rebounds per game for his career and 6.3 assists. Bird was the first player in NBA history to shoot 50% or better on field goals, 40% on three-pointers, and 90% on free-throws in a single NBA season while achieving the league minimum for makes in each category. He accomplished this feat twice. Bird won NBA three-point-shooting contests in three consecutive years. He sometimes practiced shooting three-point shots with his eyes closed.

Bird is remembered as one of the foremost clutch performers in the history of the NBA; Bird was known for his excellent play in high-stakes, high-pressure situations. Pat Riley (who had coached the LA Lakers featuring Magic Johnson against Bird's Celtics in three NBA Finals), when asked about his opinion of the best clutch performer, said "If I had to choose a player to take a shot to save a game, I'd choose Michael Jordan. If I had to choose a player to take a shot to save my life, I'd take Larry Bird."

Bird is also remembered as an excellent passer and defender. While he was relatively slow, Bird displayed a knack for anticipating the moves of his opponent, making Bird a strong team defender. He had 1,556 career steals. In recognition of his defensive abilities, Bird was named to three All-Defensive Second Teams.

Bird was known for his trash-talking on the court and is remembered as one of the most notable trash-talkers of his era. Bird was known for telling his opponents how and where in the court he would score against them; Xavier McDaniel recounted that Bird predicted a game-winning shot against him, then "shot a shot right in my face and was like 'Damn, I didn't mean to leave two seconds on the clock.'" When playing against Dennis Rodman, a player known for his defensive abilities, in the 1987 Eastern Conference finals, Bird continually belittled Rodman's ability, at one point asking Chuck Daly, Detroit's head coach, to send in someone up to the task of guarding him. Knowing that Bird used such chirping to raise his own game, Chicago Bulls superstar Michael Jordan discouraged his rookie teammate B.J. Armstrong from responding to Bird, saying: "Not a single person. Not one word. No one talk to Larry Bird". Jordan has since stated, "Larry Bird is the greatest trash-talker and mind-game player of all time. He taught me everything I know about getting in folks' heads".

Bird was widely considered one of Red Auerbach's favorite players, and he considered Bird to be the greatest basketball player of all time. Bird's humble roots were the source of his most frequently used moniker, "The Hick from French Lick". Bird was also referred to as "Larry Legend". Michael Jordan himself considers the description 'God disguised as Michael Jordan' as his favorite compliment since it came from Bird (after Game 2 of the Celtics' first-round series against the Bulls during the 1986 playoffs when Jordan scored an NBA playoff-record 63 points in a 135-131 Celtics win). Jordan has since said "Larry Bird's comments gave me credibility. Up to that point I was still perceived as a hotshot rookie, not a real player. When Bird acknowledged my performance, I became a player. I still wasn't up to his level, but I was now a player who was marked as a star, a potential Hall of Famer depending upon how I took those comments. Off the court, Larry Bird intimidated me because of who he was, what he had accomplished. And the fact that he was Larry Legend". In another example of how Bird was respected as one of the NBA's all-time greats, Jordan deferred to Bird and Magic Johnson for co-captaincy of the 1992 United States men's Olympic basketball team.

=== Legacy ===
Bird was voted onto the NBA's 50th Anniversary All-Time Team list in 1996, and inducted into the Naismith Memorial Basketball Hall of Fame in 1998. He was inducted into the Hall of Fame again in 2010, as a member of the "Dream Team". In 1999, Bird ranked No. 30 on ESPN SportsCentury's list of 50 Greatest Athletes of the 20th century. Bird also ranked No. 24 on the Associated Press's list of the 100 Greatest Athletes of the 20th century in 1999. He played both the small forward and power forward positions. Universally recognized as an all-time great player, Bird was placed at the power forward position on an NBA all-time starting five roster with fellow superstars Magic Johnson (point guard), Michael Jordan (shooting guard), LeBron James (small forward), and Kareem Abdul-Jabbar (center) in 2020.

In 2011, Bird was honored with a lifetime achievement award at The Sports Museum's 10th annual The Tradition event (celebrating New England athletes) held at TD Garden. The Missouri Valley Conference Men's Basketball Player of the Year trophy is named in Bird's honor.

There is a street named in Bird's honor on the campus of Indiana State University. In 2013, the university unveiled a bronze statue of Bird (wearing his Sycamores jersey, in mid-jump-shot pose) in front of the Hulman Center. In addition, Bird's former teammate Bob Heaton, then serving in the Indiana House of Representatives, read a proclamation from Indiana Gov. Mike Pence proclaiming Nov. 9th as Larry Bird Day in the state of Indiana.

Larry, you only told me one lie. You said there will be another Larry Bird. Larry, there will never, ever be another Larry Bird.

— Magic Johnson, as quoted at Bird's retirement party

At the 2019 NBA Awards, Bird received the NBA Lifetime Achievement Award (shared with Magic Johnson). Since 2022, the NBA will award the MVPs for the conference finals; the Eastern Conference Finals MVP trophy is named in Bird's honor, while the Western Conference trophy is named after Johnson.

In October 2021, as part of the NBA's 75th Anniversary, Bird was honored as one of the 75 greatest players of all time, by being named to the NBA's 75th Anniversary All-Time Team. To commemorate the NBA's 75th Anniversary, The Athletic ranked their top 75 players of all time, and named Bird as the seventh greatest player in NBA history.

In May 2024, the Larry Bird Museum was opened in Terre Haute, Indiana. The museum contains memorabilia from Bird's high school, college and NBA career along with interactive exhibits and interviews with coaches, teammates and rivals.

== Coaching and executive careers ==
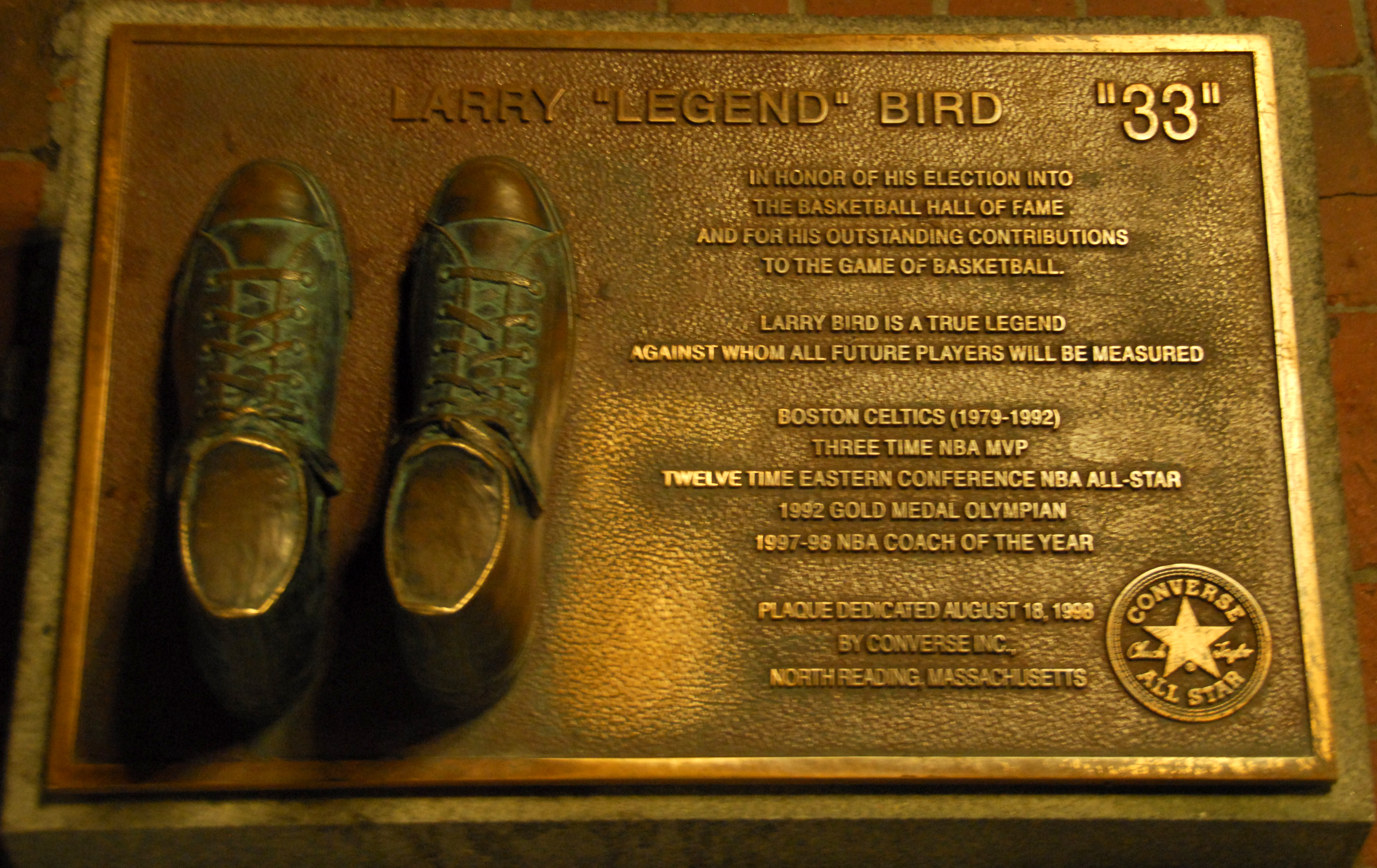
A Larry Bird plaque at Quincy Market, Boston

The Celtics employed Bird as a special assistant in the team's front office from 1992 until 1997.

In 1997, Bird accepted the position of head coach of the Indiana Pacers. Bird said that he would be on the job for no more than three years. Despite having no previous coaching experience, Bird led the Pacers to a 58–24 record—the franchise's best as an NBA team at the time—in the 1997–98 season, and pushed the eventual champion Chicago Bulls (led by superstar Michael Jordan and head coach Phil Jackson) to seven games in the Eastern Conference Finals. The 1997–98 team is considered one of the best in Pacers franchise history, and Bird was named the NBA Coach of the Year for his efforts. Bird then led the Pacers to consecutive Central Division titles in 1999 and 2000, and a berth in the 2000 NBA Finals where they lost to the Los Angeles Lakers (coached by Phil Jackson) in six games. Bird resigned his head coaching position shortly after the end of the 1999–2000 season, following through on his initial promise to coach for only three years. He was succeeded in that capacity by Isiah Thomas.

In 2003, Bird was hired as the Indiana Pacers' president of basketball operations. One of Bird's first acts as Pacers president was to replace Isiah Thomas with Rick Carlisle as head coach, due to the team's underachievement under Thomas. From 2006 onwards, Bird overhauled the roster by trading away veterans while making savvy draft picks, since the Pacers were a small-market team that could not chase expensive free agents. After the 2011–2012 NBA season, when the Pacers secured the No. 3 seed in the East and had the fifth-best record (42–24) in the league, Bird was named NBA Executive of the Year, becoming the only man in NBA history to win the NBA MVP, Coach of the Year, and Executive of the Year. On the day before the 2012 NBA draft, Bird and the Pacers announced that they would be parting ways; he said that health issues were among the reasons for his departure. Bird returned to the Pacers as president of basketball operations in 2013. He stepped down again in 2017, but stayed with the team in an advisory capacity. Bird continued to serve as an advisor until July 2022, when he "stepped back from maintaining an active role with the Indiana Pacers." Nearly a year later in June 2023, it was announced that the Pacers re-hired Bird to serve as a consultant. As of 2025, Larry Bird still holds his position as a consultant for the Indiana Pacers. Larry has recently been noted as "disappearing" from the sport. One reason according to him, is not being in a front-facing role such as a head coach, means that he doesn't have to face public scrutiny, something he has noted before. He stated in 2016, "Sometimes my job really sucks."

== Career statistics ==
=== Playing ===
==== NBA ====
Legend
GP	Games played	GS	Games started	MPG	Minutes per game
FG%	Field goal percentage	3P%	3-point field goal percentage	FT%	Free throw percentage
RPG	Rebounds per game	APG	Assists per game	SPG	Steals per game
BPG	Blocks per game	PPG	Points per game	**Bold**	Career high
†	Won an NBA championship	*	Led the league

Regular season

Year	Team	GP	GS	MPG	FG%	3P%	FT%	RPG	APG	SPG	BPG	PPG
1979–80	Boston	**82**	**82**	36.0	.474	.406	.836	10.4	4.5	1.7	.6	21.3
1980–81†	Boston	**82**	**82**	39.5	.478	.270	.863	10.9	5.5	**2.0**	.8	21.2
1981–82	Boston	77	58	38.0	.503	.212	.863	10.9	5.8	1.9	.9	22.9
1982–83	Boston	79	79	37.7	.504	.286	.840	**11.0**	5.8	1.9	.9	23.6
1983–84†	Boston	79	77	38.3	.492	.247	.888*	10.1	6.6	1.8	.9	24.2
1984–85	Boston	80	77	39.5*	.522	**.427**	.882	10.5	6.6	1.6	**1.2**	28.7
1985–86†	Boston	**82**	81	38.0	.496	.423	.896*	9.8	6.8	**2.0**	.6	25.8
1986–87	Boston	74	73	**40.6***	.525	.400	.910*	9.2	**7.6**	1.8	.9	28.1
1987–88	Boston	76	75	39.0	**.527**	.414	.916	9.3	6.1	1.6	.8	**29.9**
1988–89	Boston	6	6	31.5	.471	...	**.947**	6.2	4.8	1.0	.8	19.3
1989–90	Boston	75	75	39.3	.473	.333	.930*	9.5	7.5	1.4	.8	24.3
1990–91	Boston	60	60	38.0	.454	.389	.891	8.5	7.2	1.8	1.0	19.4
1991–92	Boston	45	45	36.9	.466	.406	.926	9.6	6.8	.9	.7	20.2
**Career**		897	870	38.4	.496	.376	.886	10.0	6.3	1.7	0.8	24.3
**All-Star**		10	9	28.7	.423	.231	.844	7.9	4.1	2.3	0.3	13.4

Playoffs

Year	Team	GP	GS	MPG	FG%	3P%	FT%	RPG	APG	SPG	BPG	PPG
1980	Boston	9	9	41.3	.469	.267	.880	11.2	4.7	1.6	0.9	21.3
1981†	Boston	17	17	44.1	.470	.375	.894	**14.0**	6.1	2.3	1.0	21.9
1982	Boston	12	12	40.8	.427	.167	.822	12.5	5.6	1.9	**1.4**	17.8
1983	Boston	6	6	40.0	.422	.250	.828	12.5	6.8	2.2	0.5	20.5
1984†	Boston	**23**	**23**	41.8	**.524**	**.412**	.879	11.0	5.9	**2.3**	1.2	**27.5**
1985	Boston	20	20	40.8	.461	.280	.890	9.1	5.8	1.7	1.0	26.0
1986†	Boston	18	18	42.8	.517	.411	**.927**	9.3	8.2	2.1	.6	25.9
1987	Boston	**23**	**23**	44.1	.476	.341	.912	10.0	7.2	1.2	0.8	27.0
1988	Boston	17	17	**44.9**	.450	.375	.894	8.8	6.8	2.1	0.8	24.5
1990	Boston	5	5	41.4	.444	.263	.906	9.2	**8.8**	1.0	1.0	24.4
1991	Boston	10	10	39.6	.408	.143	.863	7.2	6.5	1.3	0.3	17.1
1992	Boston	4	2	26.8	.500	.000	.750	4.5	5.3	0.3	0.5	11.3
**Career**		164	162	42.0	.472	.321	.890	10.3	6.5	1.8	0.9	23.8

Career-highs in regular season

Stat	High	Opponent	Date
Points, game	60	Atlanta Hawks	March 12, 1985
Points, half (2nd)	37	Atlanta Hawks	March 12, 1985
Points, half (1st)	34	Cleveland Cavaliers	March 18, 1986
Points, quarter (3rd)	24	vs. Indiana Pacers	March 30, 1983
Points without a free throw, quarter (3rd)	19	Atlanta Hawks	March 12, 1985
Consecutive points (end of game)	16	Atlanta Hawks	March 12, 1985
Field goal percentage			
Field goals made	22	Atlanta Hawks	March 12, 1985
Field goals made	22	vs. New York Knicks	April 12, 1987
Field goals made, half (2nd)	15	Atlanta Hawks	March 12, 1985
Field goals made, half (1st)	15	vs. Washington Bullets	January 27, 1988
Field goals made, quarter (3rd)	10	vs. Indiana Pacers	March 30, 1983
Field goals made, quarter (1st)	10	vs. Washington Bullets	January 27, 1988
Field goal attempts	36	Atlanta Hawks	March 12, 1985
Field goal attempts	36	vs. Chicago Bulls	March 31, 1991
Field goal attempts, half (2nd)	23	Atlanta Hawks	March 12, 1985
Free throws made, none missed			
Free throws made, one missed	16–17	vs. Milwaukee Bucks	April 12, 1985
Free throws made	16	vs. Milwaukee Bucks	April 12, 1985
Free throw attempts	17	vs. Atlanta Hawks	December 11, 1981
Free throw attempts	17	vs. Milwaukee Bucks	April 12, 1985
Three-point field goals made	7	vs. Dallas Mavericks	April 3, 1988
Three-point field goals made	7	vs. Indiana Pacers	March 4, 1991
Three-point field goal attempts	10	three	times
Rebounds	21	at Philadelphia 76ers	November 1, 1980
Rebounds	21	at Los Angeles Lakers	February 11, 1981
Rebounds	21	at Denver Nuggets	December 29, 1981
Rebounds	21 (OT)	at Washington Bullets	March 16, 1982
Offensive rebounds			
Defensive rebounds	18	at Chicago Bulls	December 13, 1980
Defensive rebounds	18	vs. Indiana Pacers	November 20, 1991
Assists	17	at Golden State Warriors	February 16, 1984
Assists	16	vs. Cleveland Cavaliers	March 21, 1990
Assists, half (1st)	14	at Golden State Warriors	February 16, 1984
Steals	9	at Utah Jazz	February 18, 1985
Steals	8 (OT)	at New Jersey Nets	October 25, 1985
Steals	8	vs. New Jersey Nets	January 3, 1986
Blocked shots			
Turnovers	10	at New York Knicks	November 17, 1979
Minutes played			

Career-highs in playoffs

Stat	High	Opponent	Date
Points	43	vs. Detroit Pistons	May 8, 1985
Points, half (2nd)	30	vs. Detroit Pistons	April 30, 1985
Points, quarter (1st)	24	vs. Atlanta Hawks	May 11, 1988
Field goal percentage			
Field goals made	17	vs. Detroit Pistons	May 8, 1985
Field goals made	16	vs. New York Knicks	May 2, 1984
Field goals made, quarter (1st)	10	vs. Atlanta Hawks	May 11, 1988
Field goal attempts	33	vs. Detroit Pistons	May 8, 1985
Free throws made, none missed	14—14	vs. Milwaukee Bucks	May 17, 1984
Free throws made, one missed	14–15	vs. Detroit Pistons	April 30, 1985
Free throws made	14	vs. Milwaukee Bucks	May 17, 1984
Free throws made	14	vs. Detroit Pistons	April 30, 1985
Free throws made, half (2nd)	12	vs. Detroit Pistons	April 30, 1985
Free throw attempts	15	vs. Milwaukee Bucks	May 15, 1984
Free throw attempts	15	vs. Los Angeles Lakers	May 31, 1984
Free throw attempts	15	at Los Angeles Lakers	June 3, 1984
Free throw attempts	15	vs. Detroit Pistons	April 30, 1985
Free throw attempts	15	at Milwaukee Bucks	May 10, 1987
Three-point field goals made	5	at Milwaukee Bucks	May 18, 1986
Three-point field goal attempts	6	vs. Milwaukee Bucks	May 15, 1986
Three-point field goal attempts	6	at Milwaukee Bucks	May 18, 1986
Rebounds	21	at Philadelphia 76ers	April 23, 1980
Rebounds	21	vs. Houston Rockets	May 5, 1981
Rebounds	21	vs. Houston Rockets	May 7, 1981
Rebounds	21 (OT)	at Los Angeles Lakers	June 6, 1984
Offensive rebounds	9	at Los Angeles Lakers	June 6, 1984
Defensive rebounds	19	at Philadelphia 76ers	April 23, 1980
Assists	16	vs. New York Knicks	April 28, 1990
Assists, half	11	vs. New York Knicks	April 28, 1990
Steals	6	at Milwaukee Bucks	May 1, 1983
Blocked shots	4	at Washington Bullets	April 21, 1984
Turnovers	10	vs. Chicago Bulls	April 7, 1981
Minutes played	56 (2 OT)	at Milwaukee Bucks	May 10, 1987

==== College ====
Year	Team	GP	GS	MPG	FG%	3P%	FT%	RPG	APG	SPG	BPG	PPG
1976–77	Indiana State	28	—	36.9	**.544**	—	**.840**	13.3	4.4	—	—	**32.8**
1977–78	Indiana State	32	—	—	.524	—	.793	11.5	3.9	—	—	30.0
1978–79	Indiana State	**34**	—	—	.532	—	.831	**14.9**	**5.5**	—	—	28.6
**Career**		94	—	—	.533	—	.822	13.3	4.6	—	—	30.3

=== Head coaching record ===
Legend
Regular season	G	Games coached	W	Games won	L	Games lost	W–L %	Win–loss %
Playoffs	PG	Playoff games	PW	Playoff wins	PL	Playoff losses	PW–L %	Playoff win–loss %

Larry Bird coaching statistics
Team	Year	G	W	L	W–L%	Finish	PG	PW	PL	PW–L%	Result
Indiana	1997–98	82	58	24	.707	2nd in Central	16	10	6	.625	Lost in Conf. Finals
Indiana	1998–99	50	33	17	.660	1st in Central	13	9	4	.692	Lost in Conf. Finals
Indiana	1999–00	82	56	26	.683	1st in Central	23	13	10	.565	Lost in NBA Finals
**Career**		214	147	67	.687		52	32	20	.615	

== Awards and honors ==
NBA

- 3× NBA champion: 1981, 1984, 1986
- 2× NBA Finals MVP: 1984, 1986
- 3× NBA Most Valuable Player: 1984–1986
- 12× NBA All-Star: 1980–1988, 1990–1992
- NBA All-Star Game MVP: 1982
- 10x All-NBA Team selections:
  - 9× All-NBA First Team: 1980–1988
  - All-NBA Second Team: 1990
- 3× NBA All-Defensive Second Team: 1982–1984
- NBA Rookie of the Year: 1980
- NBA All-Rookie First Team: 1980
- 3× NBA Three-Point Contest Champion: 1986–1988
- 2× NBA Three-Point Scoring Leader: 1986, 1987
- 4× NBA Free-Throw Percentage Leader: 1984, 1986, 1987, 1990
- 2× NBA minutes played leaders: 1985, 1987
- 2× 50–40–90 club: 1987, 1988
- Named one of the 50 Greatest Players in NBA History in 1996
- Selected to the NBA 75th Anniversary Team in 2021
- No. 33 retired by Boston Celtics
- Trophy named in Bird's honor (Larry Bird Trophy) awarded to Eastern Conference Finals MVP (established in 2022)
- NBA All-Star Game head coach: 1998
- NBA Coach of the Year: 1998
- NBA Executive of the Year: 2012
- NBA Lifetime Achievement Award: 2019

USA Basketball

- 1977 World University Games gold medal
- 1992 FIBA Americas Championship gold medal
- 1992 Olympic gold medal

NCAA

- 1979 MVC Regular Season Champion
- 1979 MVC Tournament Champion
- Consensus National Player of the Year (1979)
  - John R. Wooden Award (1979)
  - Naismith College Player of the Year (1979)
  - Oscar Robertson Trophy (1979)
  - Adolph Rupp Trophy (1979)
  - AP College Basketball Player of the Year (1979)
  - Sporting News College Basketball Player of the Year (1979)
  - UPI College Basketball Player of the Year (1979)
  - NABC Player of the Year (1979)
- 2× MVC Player of the Year (1978, 1979)
- 2× Consensus first team All-American (1978, 1979)
  - 2× AP first team All-American (1978, 1979)
  - 2× NABC first team All-American (1978, 1979)
  - 2× UPI first team All-American (1978, 1979)
  - USBWA first team All-American (1979)
- USBWA second team All-American (1978)
- NABC third team All-American (1977)
- UPI third team All-American (1977)
- 2× first team All-MVC (1978, 1979)
- NCAA total points leader (1979)
- No. 33 retired by Indiana State Sycamores

Media

- Associated Press Athlete of the Year (1986)
- Sporting News Athlete of the Year (1986)
- 2× Sporting News NBA MVP (1985, 1986)
- Sporting News Rookie of the Year (1980)
- Sporting News NBA 1980s All-Decade First Team
- AP NBA 1980s All-Decade First Team

Halls of Fame

- Two-time Naismith Memorial Basketball Hall of Fame inductee:
  - 1998 – individual
  - 2010 – member of "The Dream Team"
- National Collegiate Basketball Hall of Fame (inaugural class of 2006)
- U.S. Olympic Hall of Fame (class of 2009 as a member of "The Dream Team")
- FIBA Hall of Fame (class of 2017 as a member of "The Dream Team")
- Indiana Sports Hall of Fame (inaugural class of 2020)
- Indiana State University Athletics Hall of Fame (class of 2000)
- Indiana Basketball Hall of Fame (class of 2000)
- Missouri Valley Conference Hall of Fame (inaugural class of 1997)
- National High School Hall of Fame (class of 1995)

Other

- Received an honorary doctor of law degree from Boston University (2009)

== In popular culture ==
- Bird has appeared in three movies, each time playing himself: Blue Chips with Nick Nolte, released in 1994 by Paramount; the Warner Brothers film Space Jam with Michael Jordan and Bill Murray, in 1996; and Celtic Pride with Dan Aykroyd, Daniel Stern, and Damon Wayans, which was also released in 1996.
- A fictionalized version of Bird appears in the DIC Entertainment animated series Captain N: The Game Master episode "Pursuit of the Magic Hoop", voiced by Canadian actor Garry Chalk.
- Bird's likeness has appeared in several video games. In One on One: Dr. J vs. Larry Bird, Bird plays opposite Julius Erving in a game of one-on-one. A sequel, Jordan vs Bird: One on One, was a 1988 basketball video game. In 2011, Bird was featured on the cover of NBA 2K12, alongside Magic Johnson and Michael Jordan. Bird is also a playable character in the revamped NBA Jam.
- In a McDonald's commercial from 1991 (first aired during the Super Bowl), Bird and Michael Jordan have a trick shot contest, in which the winner got Jordan's lunch and the loser had to watch the winner eat. In a commercial during Super Bowl XLIV, Dwight Howard and LeBron James challenge each other at trick shots for a McDonald's lunch. After they finish, clapping is heard, then the camera pans to the crowd, and Bird says "Great show, guys. Thanks for lunch." Howard and James share a confused look. Howard asks, "Who was that?" James replies, "I have no idea."
- In 2013 Bird voiced himself in an episode of Futurama titled "Saturday Morning Fun Pit"; however, Bird did not want anything to do with the role so his only line is a voicemail of him telling the showrunners that he wanted no part in the episode.
- Bird has been referenced and parodied in the animated series Family Guy multiple times. In the 2016 episode Peter, Chris, & Brian where Peter Griffin sets up a cutaway when he claims he never did anything important except beating Larry Bird. In a parody of commercials Bird has done over making outrageous shots in the wager for a McDonald's Big Mac. He physically appears in the 2017 episode "Peter's Def Jam" where Peter and friends observe one of Bird's interviews.
- Until July 2023, Twitter's logo was named Larry in honor of Larry Bird.
- Bird is portrayed by Sean Patrick Small in the HBO series Winning Time: The Rise of the Lakers Dynasty.

== Personal life ==
In 1975, Bird married Janet Condra. They remained married for less than a year. Following an attempted reconciliation, Bird and Condra had a daughter, Corrie, in 1977.

Bird married Dinah Mattingly in 1989. They have two adopted children: Conner and Mariah. That same year, Bird released his autobiography Drive: The Story of My Life, which he co-wrote alongside Bob Ryan. The book recounts his life up until that point, touching upon his childhood, his father's alcoholism and suicide, his first marriage along with his triumphs on the court, and stories about teammates.

During his professional career with the Celtics, Bird lived in the Boston suburb of Brookline, Massachusetts.

Bird is an active philanthropist, especially through the Boys & Girls Clubs of America along with health-related charitable efforts. However, Bird has kept most of his efforts out of the press, seeking no publicity for his efforts. Bird once stated "All of my donations are sort of made under the table," "I don't need the publicity. I'm not doing it for the publicity. But I do care. And that's what matters most."

Bird is known to live a low-key lifestyle; in his spare time he enjoys engaging in hands-on activities. He is an avid fisherman and takes pleasure from playing golf.

During his playing days Bird said in his pre-game inspiration that he always looked up at the rafters of the Garden at former Bruins defenseman Bobby Orr's retired No. 4, instead of the retired numbers of Celtics stars such as Bill Russell, Bob Cousy, or John Havlicek.

== Publications ==
- Bird, Larry; Bischoff, John (1986). Bird on Basketball: How-to Strategies from the Great Celtics Champion. Da Capo Press. ISBN 978-0201106671.
- Bird, Larry; Ryan, Bob (1989). Drive: The Story of My Life. Bantam. ISBN 978-0553287585.
- Bird, Larry; MacMullan, Jackie (1999). Bird Watching: On Playing and Coaching the Game I Love. Grand Central Publishing. ISBN 978-0446524643.
- Bird, Larry; Johnson, Earvin; MacMullan, Jackie (2009). When the Game Was Ours. Houghton Mifflin Harcourt. ISBN 978-0547225470.

== Filmography ==
=== Film ===
Year	Film	Role	Note
1994	Blue Chips	Himself	Cameo
1996	Celtics Pride	Himself	
1996	Space Jam	Himself	

=== Television ===
Year	Show	Role	Note
2006	Back in the Day	Himself	2 episodes
2009	The Tonight Show with Conan O'Brien	Himself/Guest	
2010	Magic & Bird: A Courtship of Rivals	Himself	Documentary
2012	Late Show with David Letterman	Himself/Guest	
2012	The Dream Team	Himself	Documentary
2013	The Doctor	Himself	Documentary
2015	The Tonight Show Starring Jimmy Fallon	Himself/Guest	Reporting on the Bird Flu
2016	One in a Billion	Himself	Netflix documentary
2017	Jalen Vs. Everybody	Himself	TV movie
2020	The Last Dance	Himself	3 episodes
2013	Futurama	Himself (voice)	1 episode: Saturday Morning Fun Pit
2022	They Call Me Magic	Himself	3 episodes: mini series
2022	Legacy: The True Story of the LA Lakers	Himself	4 episodes: mini series
2023	Bill Russell: Legend	Himself	2 episodes
2023	The Luckiest Guy in the World	Himself	Documentary
2023	Dem Tinseltown Homiez, the Hollywood Guys	Himself	TV series
2024	Starting 5	Himself	1 episode

=== Music videos ===
Year	Video	Artist	Role
2011	Red Solo Cup	Toby Keith	Himself

== See also ==
- Indiana Basketball Hall of Fame
- List of NBA career scoring leaders
- List of NBA franchise career scoring leaders
- List of NBA career assists leaders
- List of NBA career steals leaders
- List of NBA career turnovers leaders
- List of NBA career free throw percentage leaders
- List of NBA career triple-double leaders
- List of NBA career playoff scoring leaders
- List of NBA career playoff assists leaders
- List of NBA career playoff rebounding leaders
- List of NBA career playoff steals leaders
- List of NBA career playoff turnovers leaders
- List of NBA career playoff free throw scoring leaders
- List of NBA career playoff triple-double leaders
- List of NBA single-game scoring leaders
- List of NBA single-game steals leaders
- List of NBA annual minutes leaders
- List of NBA players who have spent their entire career with one franchise
- List of NCAA Division I men's basketball career scoring leaders
- List of NCAA Division I men's basketball players with 2000 points and 1000 rebounds
- "Saturday Morning Fun Pit", a 2013 episode of Futurama featuring Bird voice acting as a cartoon clone version of himself
