= Indiana State Sycamores =

Collegiate sports club in the United States

- University: Indiana State University
- Nickname: Sycamores
- NCAA: Division I (FCS)
- Conference: Missouri Valley Conference (primary); Missouri Valley Football Conference
- Athletic director: Nathan Christensen
- Location: Terre Haute, Indiana
- Varsity teams: 15 (6 men's and 9 women's)
- Football stadium: Memorial Stadium (football, soccer)
- Basketball arena: Hulman Center
- Baseball stadium: Bob Warn Field
- Softball stadium: Price Field
- Other venues: Country Club of Terre Haute; Gibson Track and Field Complex; Indoor Track and Field Facility; ISU Arena; LaVern Gibson Championship Cross Country Course; Vigo County Aquatic Center
- Colors: Royal blue and white
- Mascot: Sycamore Sam
- Fight song: March On! (You Fighting Sycamores)
- Website: gosycamores.com
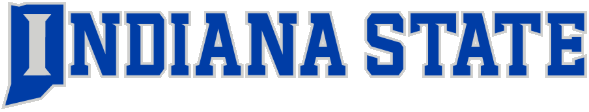

The Indiana State Sycamores are the NCAA Division I intercollegiate athletic teams of Indiana State University. Since the 1977–78 academic year, Indiana State has been a member of the Missouri Valley Conference (MVC). The Indiana State football team has competed in Division I FCS since the 1982 season, and has been a member of the Missouri Valley Football Conference (MVFC) since it was spun off from the Gateway Collegiate Athletic Conference (Gateway) when the latter league merged into the MVC in 1992. Past conference memberships include the Indiana College Athletic League (1895–1922), the Indiana Intercollegiate Conference (1922–1950), the Indiana Collegiate Conference (1950–1968) and the Midwestern Conference (1970–1972). The women's teams were Gateway members from the league's 1982 founding until its absorption by the MVC. In 1986, a year after the Gateway took on football as its only men's sport, the Sycamores football team joined that conference.

== History ==
=== "Sycamores" nickname and evolution of mascot ===
Early on in the school's history, the athletes were referred to as the "Fighting Teachers" (one of the school's early names was "Indiana State Teachers College"), until the students chose the name "Sycamores," due to the abundance of sycamore trees in Indiana and especially in the Wabash River Valley; though it is believed that the students voted on "Sycamores" on a lark, never thinking it would win. During the 1950s and 1960s, the sycamore tree itself was used as Indiana State's mascot. However, as a tree does not lend itself well to an athletic mascot, especially considering Indiana State's in-state rivalries with the Ball State Cardinals and Butler Bulldogs, the university created an Indian mascot named "Chief Quabachi," and his "Princess," in 1969. This change paid homage to the fact that ISU was the "State University" of a state named after Indians (prior to statehood Indiana was primarily inhabited by Indians). The university dropped the "Chief Quabachi" mascot in 1989 in response to a variety of objections over use of the Indian caricature and did not have another mascot until 1995, when a blue-and-white gender neutral woodland creature named "Sycamore Sam" became Indiana State's mascot.

== Sports sponsored ==
A member of the Missouri Valley Conference, Indiana State University sponsors six men's and nine women's teams in NCAA sanctioned sports. Indiana State's softball team has appeared in two Women's College World Series in 1974 and 1976.

| Men's sports | Women's sports |
|---|---|
| Baseball | Basketball |
| Basketball | Cross country |
| Cross country | Golf |
| Football | Soccer |
| Track and field^{†} | Softball |
| | Swimming and diving |
| | Track and field^{†} |
| | Volleyball |
† – Track and field includes both indoor and outdoor

== National championships ==
=== National team championships (3) ===
As of August 1, 2023, Indiana State has won three National Championships; one NCAA team championship, one NAIA team championship and one USBC title.

The men's basketball team won the 1950 NAIA National Championship.

Kurt Thomas led the men's gymnastics team to the 1977 NCAA National Championship. In 1973 and 1979, the team finished third in the NCAA Championships. In 1971, Coach Margit "Grete" Treiber led the ISU women's gymnastics team to a national runner-up finish at the AIAW National Championships. In 1964, Coach Roger Counsil led the ISU men's freshman gymnastics team to a national runner-up finish at the NCAA Championships.

The women's bowling team won the 1984 United States Bowling Congress' National Intercollegiate Championship.

The men's basketball team was the NCAA Division I national runner-up in 1979; the 2024 NIT finalist and the NCAA College Division national runner-up in 1968.

The men's basketball team was the national runner-up in the 1946 and 1948 NAIA National Championship Tournaments. The 1950 title team placed eight players on the 1951 Pan-American Games gold medal-winning team. Head Coach John Longfellow also served as co-head coach of the Pan-American Games team.

=== NCAA National Individual Championships (30) ===
Indiana State athletes have won 30 NCAA Individual Championships.

- Holli Hyche (Indoor/Outdoor Track) – 7

(Indoor: 55M – 1993, 1994; 200M – 1993 & 1994)
(Outdoor: 100M – 1993; 200M – 1993, 100M – 1994)

- Kurt Thomas (Gymnastics) – 5

(All-Around 1977, 1979, Parallel Bars 1977, 1979, Horizontal Bar 1979)

- Kylie Hutson (Indoor; Outdoor Track) – 4

(Indoor and Outdoor Pole Vault 2009, Indoor^{^} and Outdoor^{†} Pole Vault 2010)
^{^} Indoor: 14' 9" – NCAA Record
^{†} Outdoor: 14’ 7.25" – NCAA Record

- Felisha Johnson (Indoor/Outdoor Track) – 2

(Indoor Weight Throw 2011, 2013)

- David Seal (Gymnastics) – 2

(Rings 1970, 1972)

- Curt Hahn (Gymnastics) – 1

(Sidehorse 1964)

- Ken Scorra (Gymnastics) – 1

(Horizontal Bars 1964)

- Jim Price (Gymnastics) – 1

(Trampoline 1968)

- Bob Mahorney (Gymnastics) – 1

(Rings 1973)

- Ed Slezak (Gymnastics) – 1

(Pommel Horse 1973)

- Rick Danley (Gymnastics) – 1

(Horizontal Bar 1974)

- Mike Hanna (Outdoor Track) – 1

(Pole Vault 1968)

- Bruce Baumgartner (Wrestling) – 1

(Heavyweight 1982)

- Chris Lancaster (Outdoor Track) – 1

(110M High Hurdles 1990)

- Aubrey Herring (Indoor Track) – 1

(60M Hurdles 2001)

=== NAIA Individual Championships (5) ===
- John Caddell (Swimming & Diving) – 3

(1M Diving 1963, 1964; 3M Diving 1964)

- Mike Lane (Swimming & Diving) – 1

(3M Diving 1965)

- Larry Dalton (Swimming & Diving) – 1

(200M Freestyle 1965)

=== Other Individual Championships (5) ===
- Sarah Brumgart (Gymnastics) – 1

(Balance Beam) DGWS National Collegiate Championship – 1971

- Cheryl Pedlow Bridges-Flanagan (Outdoor track) – 2

(1 mile, 880 yards) DGWS National Collegiate Championship – 1969

- Mike Hanna (Indoor track) – 2

(Pole Vault) Canadian Indoor National Championship – 1968, 1969

== Olympians (13) ==
Indiana State has produced 13 Olympians; 11 for the United States, 1 (Chloe Farro) for Aruba & 1 (Greggmar Swift) for Barbados. Additionally, several ISU Coaches have US Olympic ties; Roger Counsil was the 1980 US Olympic Gymnastics coach, Erin Gilreath, ass't track & field coach competed in the 2004 Summer Olympics

- Kurt Thomas – Gymnastics, 1976 Summer Olympics, 1980 Summer Olympics
- Benita Edds – Archery, 1984 Summer Olympics
- Bruce Baumgartner – Wrestling, Gold Medalist 1984 Summer Olympics; Silver Medalist 1988 Summer Olympics; Gold Medalist 1992 Summer Olympics; Bronze Medalist 1996 Summer Olympics
- Bryan Leturgez – Bobsleigh (Men's Four) – 1988 Winter Olympics, 1992 Winter Olympics,
- Larry Bird – Basketball, Gold Medalist – 1992 Summer Olympics
- Greggmar Swift – Track & Field (110m hurdles) – Barbados - 2012 Summer Olympics
- Felisha Johnson – Track & Field (shot put) – 2016 Summer Olympics
- Evan Austin – Swimming & Dive (50m butterfly), Gold Medalist; (400m freestyle), Bronze Medalist; – 2020 Summer Paralympics; 2024 Paralympics
- Rob Griswold – Swimming & Dive (100m backstroke), Gold Medalist & World Record; (100m butterfly), Gold Medalist – 2020 Summer Paralympics
- Noah Malone – Track & Field (4x100 relay), Gold Medalist; (400m sprint), Silver Medalist; (100m sprint), Silver Medalist – 2020 Summer Paralympics; 2024 Paralympics
- Erin Reese - Track & Field (Hammer Throw) - 2024 Summer Olympics
- Mary Theisen-Lappen - Weightlifting - 2024 Summer Olympics
- Chloe Farro - Swimming & Diving (50m freestyle) - Aruba - 2024 Summer Olympics

== National team athletes & coaches ==
- Roger Adkins – 1951 U.S. National Basketball Team Pan American Games
- Dick Atha – 1951 U.S. National Basketball Team Pan American Games
- Richard Babcock – 1951 U.S. National Basketball Team Pan American Games
- Bob Gilbert – 1951 U.S. National Basketball Team Pan American Games
- Tom Kern – 1951 U.S. National Basketball Team Pan American Games
- Gene Lambdin – 1951 U.S. National Basketball Team Pan American Games
- Ed Longfellow – 1951 U.S. National Basketball Team Pan American Games
- Cliff Murray – 1951 U.S. National Basketball Team Pan American Games
- Sarah Brumgart – 1973 U.S. National Team (Rhythmic Gymnastics)
- Kurt Thomas - 1975-1980 U.S. National Gymnastics Team
- Larry Bird – 1977 U.S. National Basketball Team World University Games
- Larry Bird – 1978 U.S. National Basketball Team World Invitational Tournament
- Carl Nicks – 1979 U.S. National Select Basketball Team
- Roger Counsil – 1978–1980 U.S. National Gymnastics Team (Coach)
- Bruce Baumgartner – 1982–1996 U.S. National Wrestling Team
- Mike Gardiner - 1984 Canadian National Team
- Mike Gardiner - 1985 Canada - Intercontinental Cup
- Steve Cooksey – 1998–2013 U.S. National Track & Field Team (Coach)
- Greggmar Swift – 2007–2015, 2019 Barbadian National Track & Field Team
- Mangisto Arop - 2009 Canadian FIBA U-18 National Team

== James E. Sullivan Award (2) ==
Indiana State has produced 2 Sullivan Award winners:

- Kurt Thomas 1979 winner; World Champion (1978, 1979), NCAA Champion (1977) (men's gymnastics)
- Bruce Baumgartner 1995 winner; Olympic Champion (1984, 1992), World Champion (1986, 1993, 1995), Pan-American Champion (1987, 1991, 1995), NCAA Champion (1982) (freestyle wrestling)

== All-Americans (175) ==
Indiana State has produced 175 All-Americans:

- The Men's Gymnastics Team leads with 46 All-Americans (1964–1980).
- The Football Team has 34 All-Americans (1967–2019)
- The Baseball Team has produced 26 All-Americans (1963–2000)
- The Women's Cross-Country & Track and Field Teams have produced 27 All-Americans (1969–2026)
- The Men's Cross-Country & Track and Field Teams have produced 21 All-Americans (1958–2017)
- The Men's Basketball Team has produced 14 All-Americans (1930–1979)
- The Wrestling Team produced 7 All-Americans (1933–1986)

== Conference champions (98) ==
=== Indiana College Athletic League (1900–1922) ===
- 3 titles in baseball

=== Indiana Intercollegiate Conference (1923–1947) ===
- 6 titles in baseball
- 5 titles in men's basketball

=== Indiana Collegiate Conference (1950–1968) ===
30 titles in baseball, men's basketball, men's cross-country, men's golf, football, men's swimming, men's track & field and wrestling.

- Paul Wolf—ICC Baseball Coach of the Year (1958, 1963, 1966 and 1967)
- Duane Klueh—ICC Basketball Coach of the Year (1959, 1963, 1966, 1967)
- Mark Dean—ICC Football Coach of the Year (1952)
- Bill Jones—ICC Football Coach of the Year (1959, 1960, 1963)
- Jerry Huntsman—ICC Football Coach of the Year (1966)
- Paul Selge—ICC Swimming Coach of the Year (1965)
- Chester Sanders—ICC Wrestling Coach of the Year (1966)
- Ted Parker—ICC Wrestler of the Year (1966)

=== Gateway Conference (1982–1992) ===
4 titles in women's basketball, women's track & field and women's cross-country.

- Andi Myers—Gateway Basketball Coach of the Year (1988)

=== Missouri Valley Conference (1977–present) ===
- 65 titles
  - 16 in men's track & field (12 outdoor, 4 indoor)
  - 13 in women's track & field (7 outdoor, 6 indoor)
  - 9 in men's cross-country
  - 10 in baseball
  - 5 in men's tennis
  - 4 in men's basketball
  - 3 in women's basketball
  - 2 in women's cross-country
  - 2 in softball
  - 1 in women's tennis

Of particular note, the Runnin' Sycamores (the men's and women's cross-country and track & field teams) have won 32 titles in the past 26 seasons.

* Note – All of the above championship information is from the media guides available at www.gosycamores.com or from the Indiana State archives (each yearbook from 1896 to 1993 is available).

== Championship host ==
Indiana State University has hosted thirteen (2002, 2004–2011, 2013–14, 2016–2017) NCAA Division I cross country championships at the LaVern Gibson Championship Cross Country Course. ISU will also host the 2018 NCAA Great Lakes Regionals in cross country and the 2019 NCAA Division I Nationals.

Indiana State University hosted the 10th NCAA Wrestling Championships in 1937, at a time when the school had yet to establish a wrestling program. In 1965, the university hosted the National NAIA Wrestling tournament.

The university also hosted the 1972 US Olympic Trials and the 1975 NCAA Gymnastics National Championships.

== Rivalry ==
Indiana State University's rivalries include the Illinois State Redbirds, cross-state Ball State Cardinals (formerly a regional campus of Indiana State) with whom the Sycamores football team competed for the Victory Bell, the Evansville Purple Aces and the nearby Eastern Illinois Panthers.

== Athletic bands ==
Indiana State's marching band is called the Marching Sycamores. The marching band performs at home football games and is the feature band at the Brickyard 400. There are two alternating bands that play at men's and women's basketball games, known as the Blue and White Basketball Bands.

== Athletes & coaches ==
- Clint Barmes (baseball)
- Bruce Baumgartner Olympic & World Champion (freestyle wrestling), James E. Sullivan Award (1995)
- Junius Bibbs (baseball) (1933–1944)
- Larry Bird (basketball)
- Roger Counsil 1980 U.S. Olympic & 1977 NCAA Champion Coach (men's gymnastics)
- Glenn M. Curtis (head basketball coach)
- Brian Dorsett (baseball)
- Vencie Glenn (football)
- Robert Griswold (swimming)
- Bill Hayes (MLB baseball)
- Bill Hodges (head basketball coach)
- Tunch Ilkin (football)
- Duane Klueh (basketball, player and coach)
- Felisha Johnson (track, shot put)
- Bob King (head basketball coach)
- Bryan Leturgez (Olympic bobsledding)
- Sean Manaea (baseball)
- Thad Matta (basketball coach)
- Carl Nicks (basketball)
- Jake Odum (basketball)
- Brian Omogrosso (baseball)
- Sean Payton (football coach)
- Jake Petricka (baseball)
- Dave Schellhase (head basketball coach)
- Steve Smith (track and field) Silver Medalist, 1995 Pan-Am Games
- Gordon Stauffer (head basketball coach)
- Zane Smith (baseball)
- Greggmar Swift (Olympic hurdler)
- Joe Thatcher (baseball)
- Kurt Thomas World & NCAA Champion (men's gymnastics), James E. Sullivan Award (1979)
- Robert Tonyan (football)
- John Wooden 10x NCAA Champion (head basketball coach)
