= Cheer for the Blue and White =

Fight song of Indiana State University

"Cheer for the Blue and White" is a fight song of Indiana State University. The words and music were written by Malcolm Scott, who also arranged "Dear Old Rose," the school song for Rose Poly. Scott was a graduate of Indiana State Teachers College earning a degree in music.

Sheet music for "Cheer for the Blue and White"

"Cheer for the Blue and White" was written in 1931 as an entry in the 1931 College song contest, and was selected by the Song Book committee as the winner, making it the first official pep song of the college. It was replaced as the college's primary fight song in 1939, when Joseph A. Gremelspacher wrote March On! (You Fighting Sycamores) as a new fight song.

The Pride of Indiana and Indiana State University basketball band still play "Cheer for the Blue and White" as a pep song during games.

== Lyrics ==
Fight! Fight! For Dear Old State
Raise our banners from far and wide.
Faithful and true we hail to you
with all our loyalty and pride

Shout! Shout for the Blue and White
And sing your praises loud and clear
Glory and honor to Dear Old State
We're right behind you here

== See also ==
- March On! (You Fighting Sycamores) - Modern fight song of Indiana State University
