= Michael Simmons Student Activity Center =

Recreation facility in Terre Haute, Indiana, US

- Interactive map of Michael Simmons Student Activity Center
- Location: N 9th St; Terre Haute, Indiana 47803
- Coordinates: 39.473130°N 87.404245°W
- Owner: Indiana State University
- Operator: Indiana State University
- Capacity: 2,500

Construction
- Groundbreaking: Summer 2005
- Opened: October 21, 2005
- Cost: $701,000 ($1.16 million in 2025 dollars)
- General contractor: MSI Construction, INC.

Tenant
- 2005-present Indiana State University (NCAA)

Michael Simmons Student Activity Center is the current home of Indiana State University Trike and Tandem Races in Terre Haute, Indiana, USA. Constructed in 2005 by MSI Construction, INC. of Clinton Indiana to seat approximately 2,500 people, the facility's primary use is the home of Homecoming tradition of trike and the spring week tradition of Tandem. The stadium was officially dedicated on October 21, 2005. The stadium and its grounds also are used for intramural softball and football.
