= Bryan Leturgez =

American bobsledder and football player

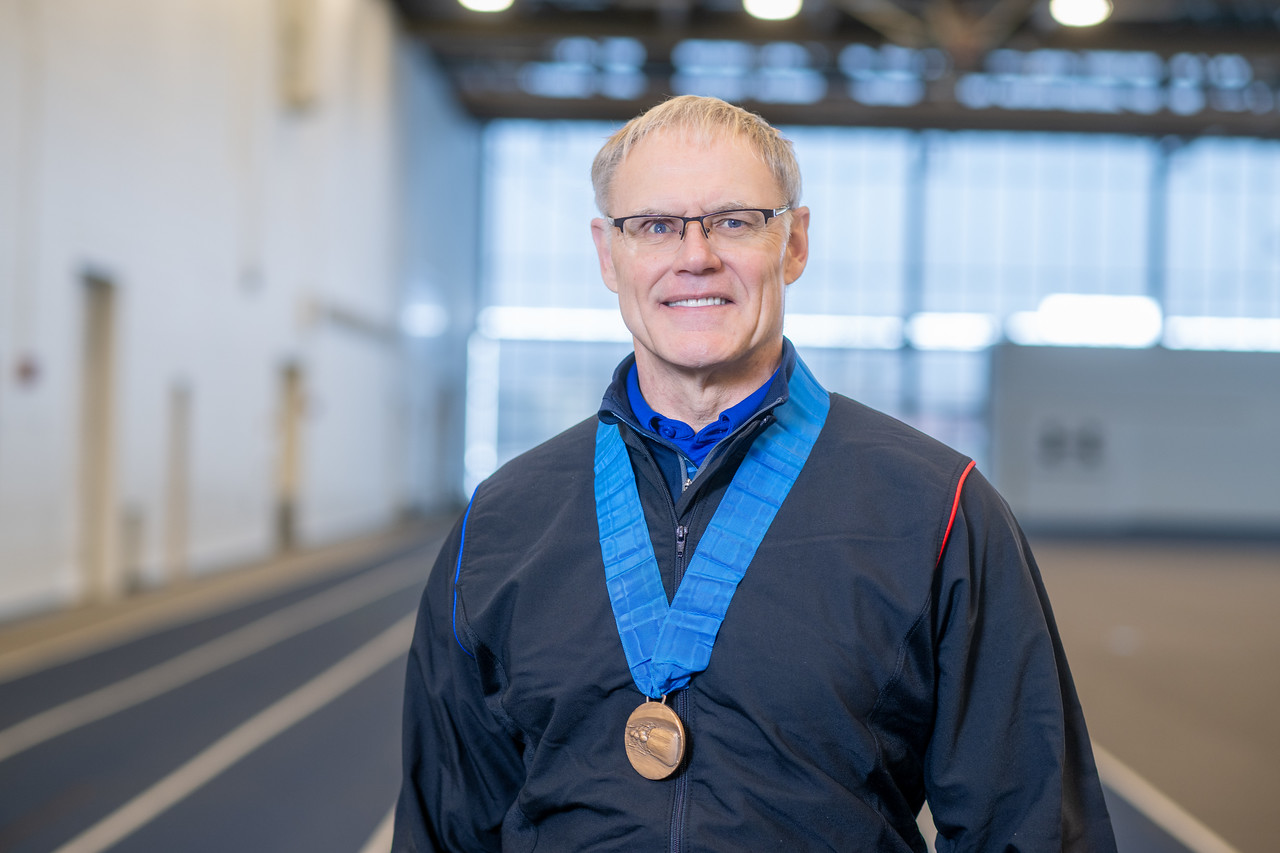
- Leturgez in 2024 with his Bronze Medal

Personal information
- Full name: Bryan Robert Leturgez
- Born: August 3, 1962 (age 64) Terre Haute, Indiana, U.S.
Medal record
Men's bobsleigh
Representing the United States
World Championships
Bronze medal – third place	1993 Igls	Four-man

Bryan Robert Leturgez (born August 3, 1962) is an American football player, track and field athlete and bobsledder who competed from 1988 to 1998.

== Biography ==
A native of Indiana, he was born in Terre Haute. His mother and father were in the education field and moved a number of times as opportunities opened up. He graduated from Kankakee Valley High School in 1981, where he had competed in five different sports under eleven coaches. After graduating, he attended Purdue University on a full-ride football scholarship where he stayed for two years before transferring to Indiana State University on a track & field scholarship. He set the school records in the high jump 7' 1 3/4" and the 400IM hurdles. He also qualified and competed in the 1986 NCAA Track & Field Championships as well as the 1988 Olympic Track & Field Trials in the 400 IM hurdles. Leturgez's skills in both football and track led him to try out for bobsled in the fall of 1988 when he made the World Cup team and competed for the next ten years.

During those 10 years in bobsled, he earned numerous gold medals throughout his career. His best year came during the 1992–93 season when his 4-man team won 3 gold medals, one silver medal, and one bronze medal in World Cups events and won the bronze in the World Championships in Igls, Austria. This team also went on to win the 4-man overall World Cup Championship that season. Leturgez competed in three Winter Olympic Games, beginning in 1992 in Albertville, France, where he was named team Captain for the 1992 Olympic Bobsled Team in which he earned his best finish of 11th in the four-man event. He also competed in the 1994 - Lillehammer, Norway, and 1998 - Nagano, Japan games. Leturgez also won 6 World Push Championships Gold medals in Monaco, Monte Carlo, hosted by Prince Albert Grimaldi, setting world records in the 1994 World Push Championships in both the two-man and four-man events.

Leturgez graduated from Indiana State University in 1991 with a Business Degree then went to work for Anheuser Busch in Riverside, California before moving to Atlanta, Georgia to work for Coca-Cola. After retiring from bobsled, he took a position with Interstate Johnson Lane a regional brokerage firm later named Wachovia Securities in Atlanta, and has been in the securities industry for 20 years. He currently resides in Marshall, Illinois, is the father of two high school daughters, and works at the Indiana State University Foundation as the Director of Corporate Partnerships. In October 2008 he was elected to the Indiana State University Athletic Hall of Fame. In 2021, Leturgez was inducted in the first class of the Kankakee Valley High School Hall of Fame.
