= State Normal Library =

- U.S. National Register of Historic Places
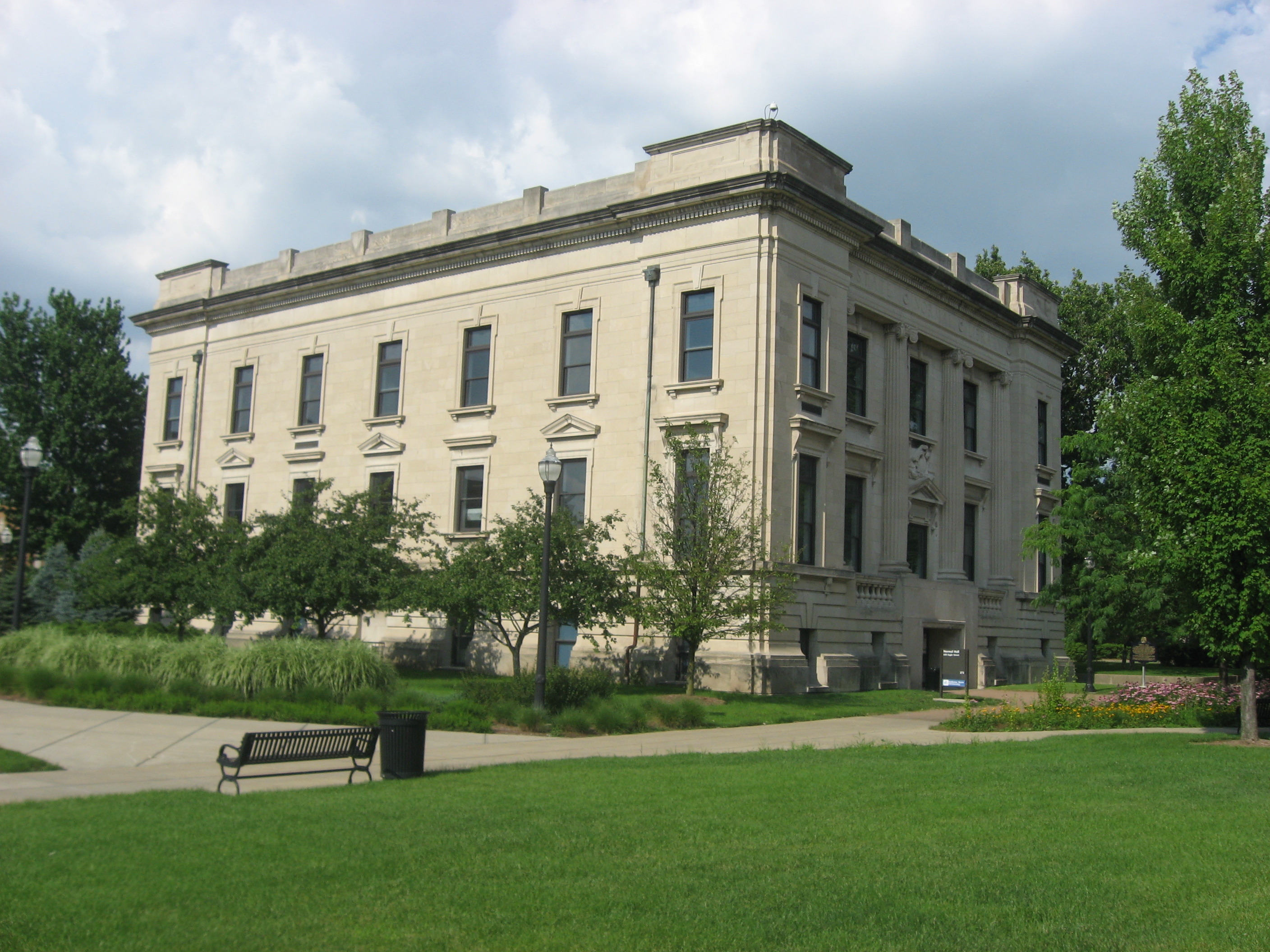
- State Normal Library, July 2011

- Location within Vigo County, Indiana Location within Indiana Location within the United States
- Location: 626 Eagle St., Terre Haute, Indiana
- Coordinates: 39°28′11″N 87°24′30″W
- Area: less than one acre
- Built: 1907
- Architect: Alexander, James F.; Miller and Yeager (addition)
- Architectural style: Classical Revival
- NRHP reference No.: 02000690
- Added to NRHP: June 27, 2002

State Normal Library, also known as the Normal Hall, is a historic library building located on the campus of Indiana State University at Terre Haute, Indiana. It was built between 1907 and 1909, and is a three-story, Classical Revival style brick and limestone building. An addition was constructed in 1957, creating an "L"-plan. The front facade features five engaged fluted, Ionic order columns.

It was listed on the National Register of Historic Places in 2002.
