= Indiana State University Marching Sycamores =

College marching band in Terre Haute, Indiana

- School: Indiana State University
- Location: Terre Haute, IN
- Conference: Missouri Valley
- Founded: 1933
- Members: around 150
- Fight song: "March On You Fighting Sycamores"

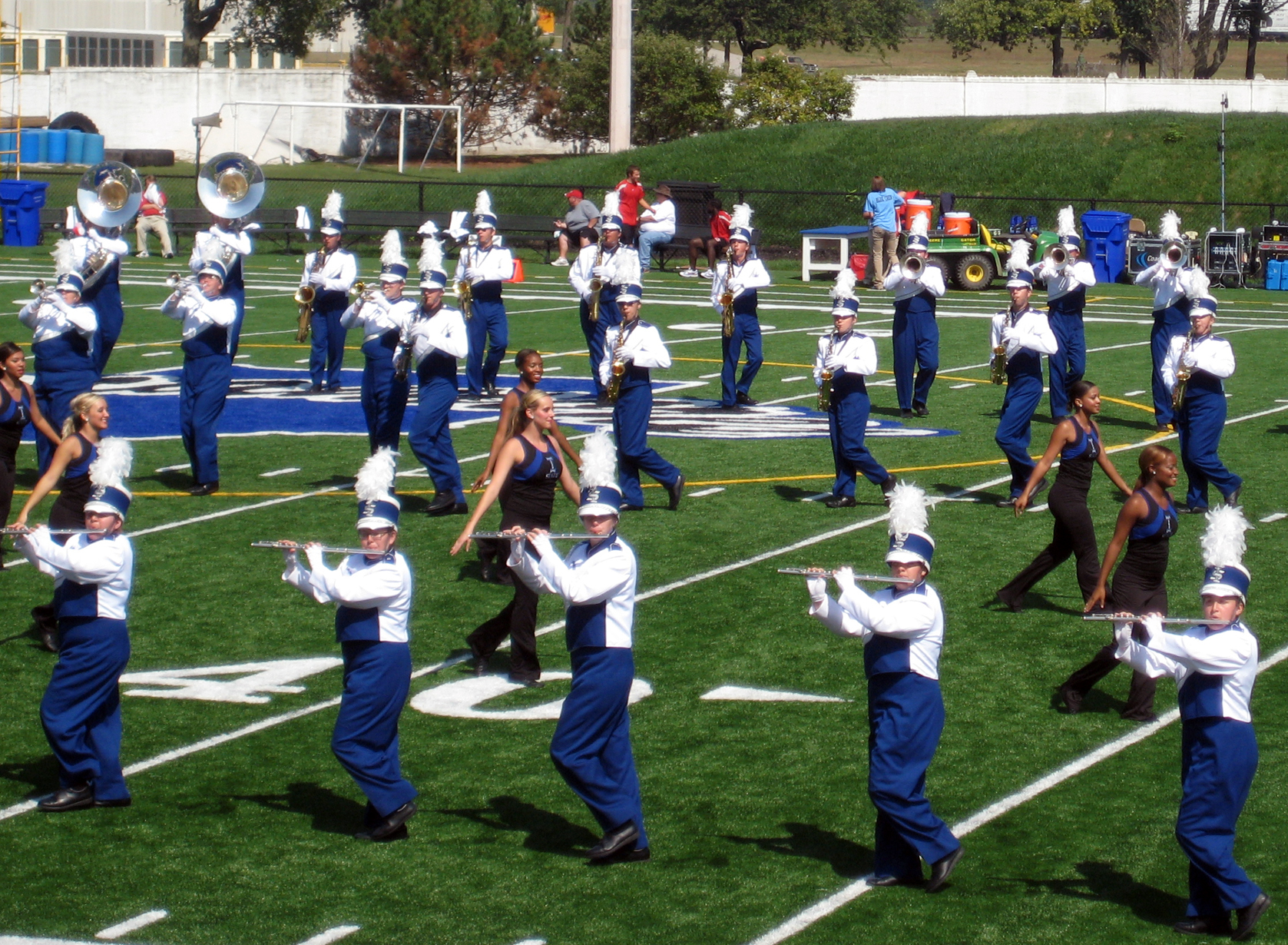
Marching Sycamores performing in 2009

The Indiana State University Marching Sycamores is the marching band of Indiana State University. The Marching Sycamores are the university's musical ambassadors and are one of the most active and visible student organizations on campus with a long and proud tradition. In addition to performing at all home games, the Marching Sycamores have performed for half time shows at games of the NFL's Chicago Bears and Indianapolis Colts, the Brickyard 400 NASCAR race, National Bands of America Finals, the Mid-States Marching Band Contest, and several other exhibition performances throughout the region.

The Marching Sycamores first appeared on campus in 1933 with 42 members and a drum major. The band played at every football and basketball home game as well as baseball games against Purdue and Indiana University. An all-male organization until 1942, the Sycamores admitted 20 women in order to replace members serving overseas in World War II and has remained co-educational since. In 2020, the band did not field a halftime show due to COVID-19. Since then, the band's numbers have continued to drop from a decades-long high of 180 members in 2017 due to declining enrollment.

== Notable alumni ==
- Noma Gurich - Chief Justice of the Supreme Court of Oklahoma (2019); Gurich was a member of the Marching Sycamores 1971–75.
