= March On! (You Fighting Sycamores) =

Indiana State University fight song

"March On! (You Fighting Sycamores)" is the official school fight song of Indiana State University. The song and lyrics were written by ISU professor of music Joseph A. Gremelspacher as a pep song.

"March On!" was first performed at a Homecoming pep rally on October 20, 1939. "March On!" replaced "Cheer for the Blue and White" as the school's primary fight song.

"March On!" is performed by the Indiana State basketball band at every home basketball game, and by the Marching Sycamores at every home football game. When Indiana State wins, the band alters the fight song to have a waltz feel, which is known as "Waltz On!".

== Lyrics ==
March on! March on, you fighting Sycamores, Sycamores!
March on, you Statesmen tried and true! ISU!
March on! March on to glorious victory
Raise that flag of royal blue!
March on! March on, you fighting Sycamores, Sycamores!
Shout out the vict'ry song!
Onward, ever onward to our goal!
As we march on and on!
Go Big Blue! Fight Big Blue!
GO! STATE! WIN!

== See also ==
Cheer for the Blue and White - Former fight song, current school song
