= Indiana State University =

Public university in Terre Haute, Indiana, US

Coordinates: 39.470°N 87.410°W

- Former names: Indiana State Normal School (1865–1929); Indiana State Teachers College (1929–1961); Indiana State College (1961–1965)
- Type: Public doctoral university
- Established: 1865; 161 years ago
- Academic affiliations: Space-grant
- Endowment: $120.4 million (2025)
- President: Mike Godard
- Faculty: 565
- Students: 8,305 (fall 2023)
- Undergraduates: 6,669 (fall 2023)
- Postgraduates: 1,636 (fall 2023)
- Location: Terre Haute, Indiana, U.S.
- Campus: Small city, 435 acres (176 ha)
- Colors: Royal blue and white
- Nickname: Sycamores
- Sporting affiliations: NCAA Division I – MVC
- Mascot: Sycamore Sam
- Website: www.indstate.edu

Indiana State University (ISU) is a public university in Terre Haute, Indiana, United States. It was founded in 1865 and offers over 100 undergraduate majors and more than 75 graduate and professional programs. Indiana State is classified among "D/PU: Doctoral/Professional Universities".

== History ==
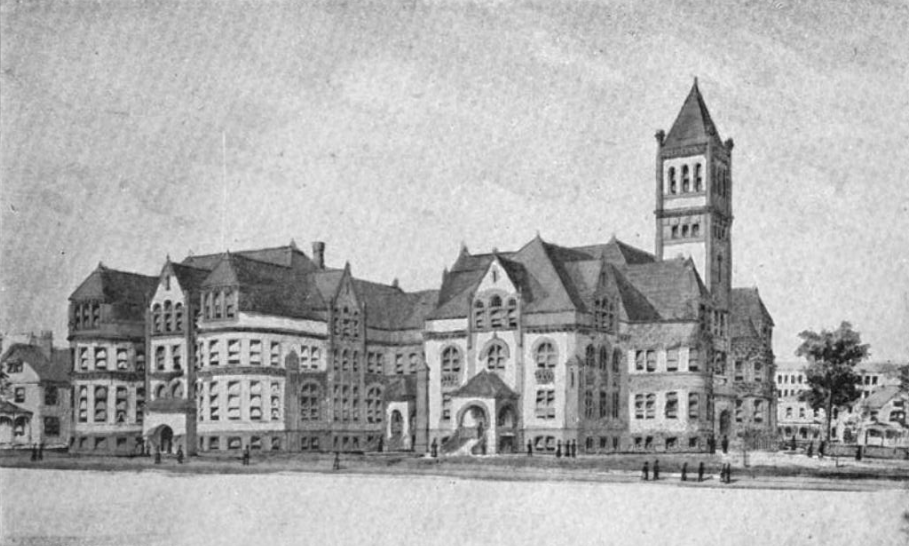
Indiana State Normal School in 1903

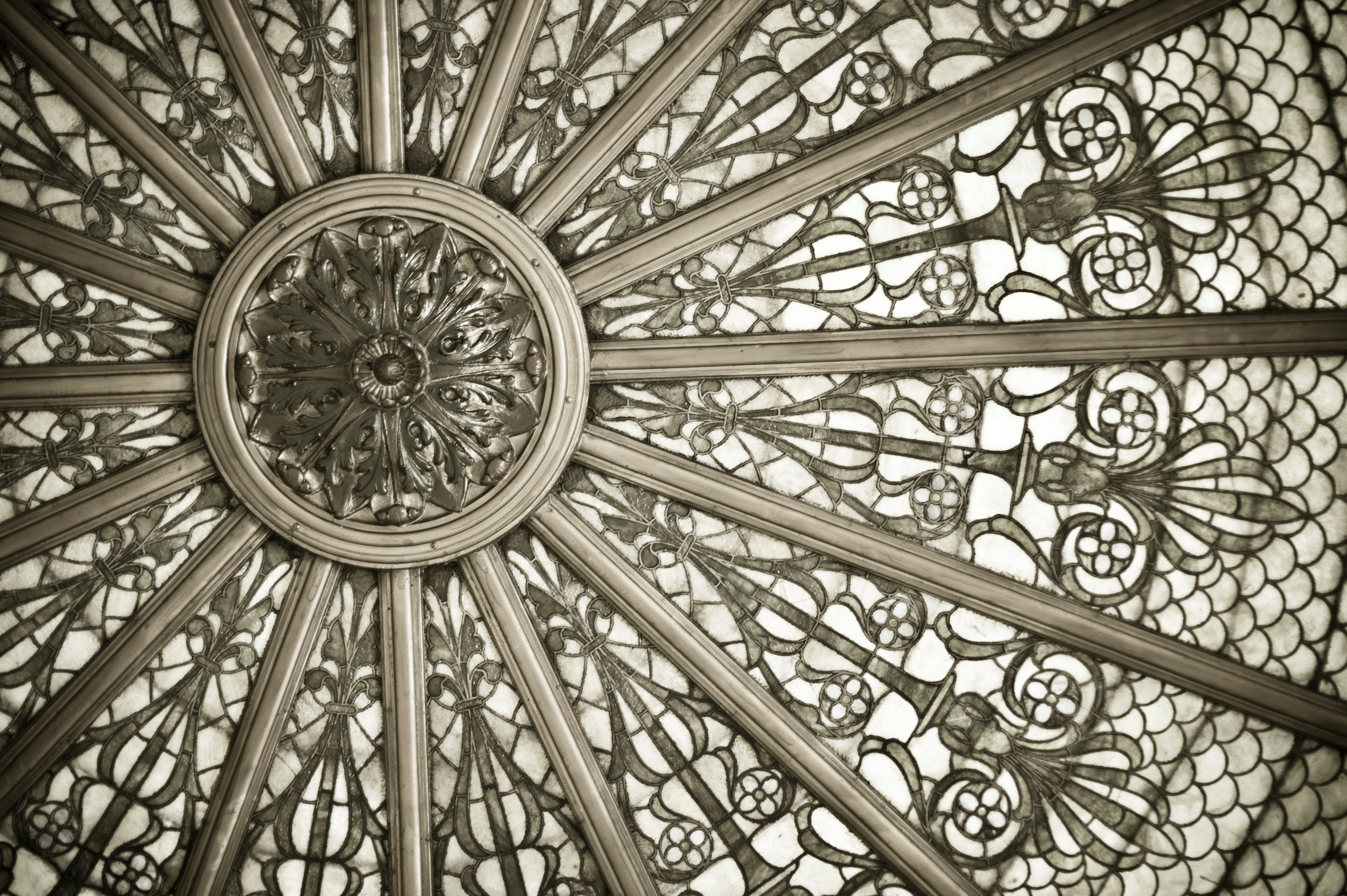
Fairbanks Hall Dome

Indiana State University was established by the Indiana General Assembly on December 20, 1865, as the Indiana State Normal School in Terre Haute. Its location in Terre Haute was secured by a donation of $73,000 by Chauncey Rose.

As the State Normal School, its core mission was to educate elementary and high school teachers.

The school awarded its first baccalaureate degrees in 1908 and the first master's degrees in 1928. In 1929, the Indiana State Normal School was renamed as the Indiana State Teachers College, and in 1961, it was renamed Indiana State College due to an expanding mission. In 1965, the Indiana General Assembly renamed the college as Indiana State University in recognition of increasing student population and expansion of degrees offered.

A seminary building was constructed and later used for Vigo Collegiate Institute. After several years the school closed and the property sold to be part of a public institution of education. It is now part of the Indiana State University campus.

== Campus ==
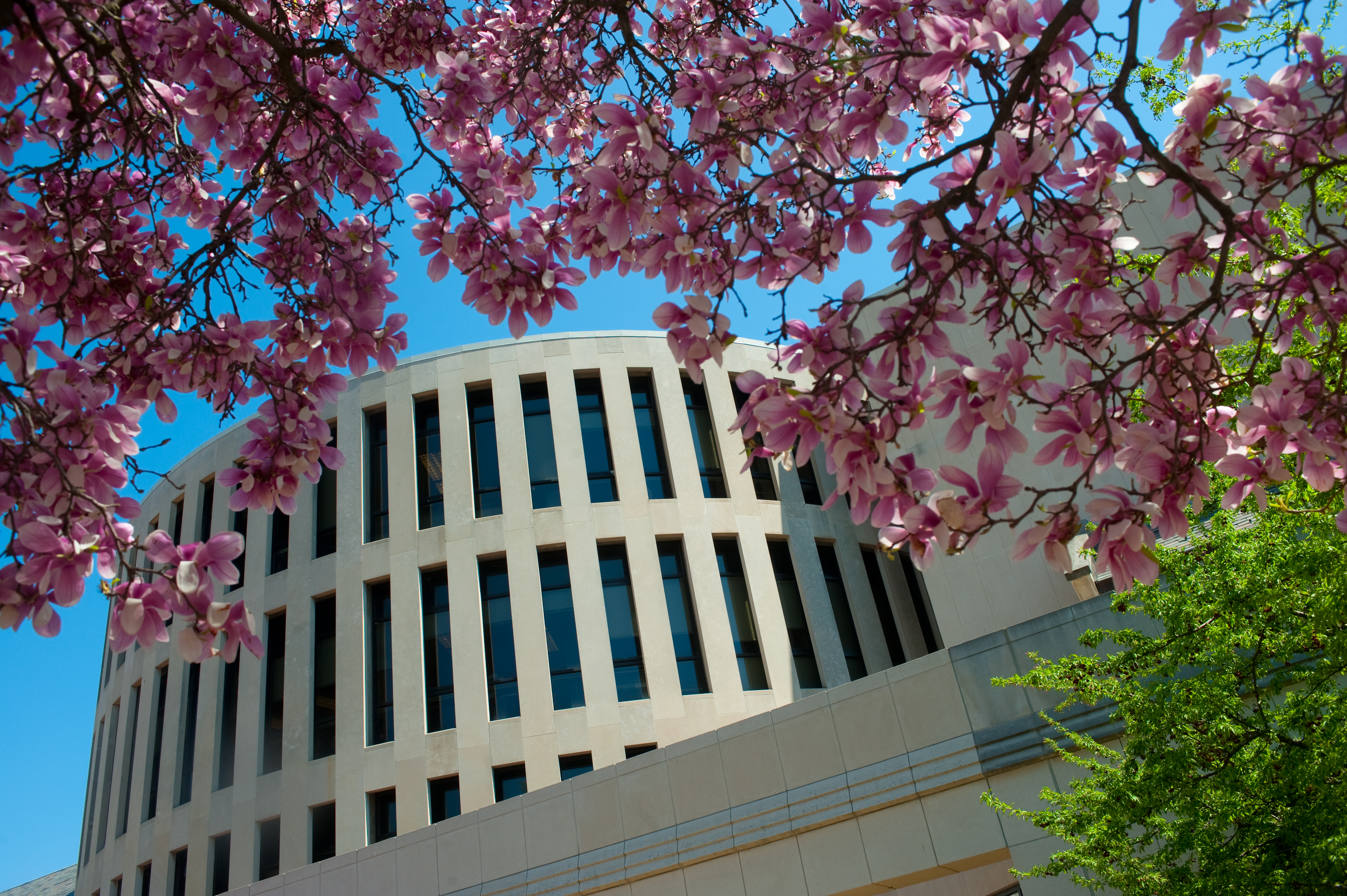
Rankin Hall

The Indiana State University main campus is located on the north side of Terre Haute's downtown business district and covers more than 200 acres (0.81 km^{2}) in the heart of the city. The main campus comprises over 60 brick and limestone buildings, halls and laboratories. Efforts to beautify the campus continue: a section of Seventh Street that runs by the university has been converted into a boulevard with flower beds and antique light posts; the old power plant was razed in 2002 and replaced with a modern facility; Stalker Hall reopened in fall 2005 after a complete renovation; Normal Hall, a Neo-Classic building erected in 1909, originally served as the library, was newly renovated in 2015. In 2009, the university dedicated a more than 109,000-square-foot (10,100 m^{2}) Student Recreation Center, financed via private funding and student fees, and the Bayh College of Education was relocated to the newly renovated, historic University Hall. The Scott College of Business has relocated to the renovated former Terre Haute Federal Building, a classic Art Deco building built in 1933. In fall 2019, the Fine Arts Building was rededicated after a $15 million renovation begun in the summer of 2018. In 2020, The Hulman Center athletic arena was renovated at a cost of $50 million. In February 2023, Dreiser Hall was rededicated after an $18 million renovation. Beginning in 2024, the Technology Annex building was demolished and rebuilt as part of a $66 million modernization and expansion effort, which was the largest capital project funded by the State of Indiana in University history.

The Indiana State University field campus is an outdoor teaching, learning, and research area designed to accommodate educational programs and services. The field campus is located on 93 acres (380,000 m^{2}) approximately 18 miles (29 km) east of Terre Haute near Brazil, Indiana, and includes eight man-made lakes.

=== Fairbanks Hall ===
Fairbanks Hall serves not only as an academic space for learning but also as a performance and fine arts venue. The Bare-Montgomery Gallery located inside provides students with the opportunity to exhibit their work or to curate exhibitions of student work.

Fairbanks Hall serves as both a working art studio as well as gallery space for the art department of Indiana State University. Originally built as a Terre Haute public library in 1903–06; it is an outstanding example of Beaux-Arts architecture and constructed entirely from Indiana Limestone.

In 1903, Fairbanks offered to construct a new public library on a site the city would provide; it was to be named in honor of his mother Emeline Fairbanks. Terre Haute acquired a parcel of land at Seventh and Eagle Streets by May 5, 1903, and the groundbreaking took place on March 15, 1904. On August 10, 1904, the cornerstone was placed. A time capsule containing the history of the building, as well as a list of city and university officials, photographs of the namesake Fairbanks family, a copy of the program for the ceremony, copies of the city's newspapers and a 1904 Terre Haute city directory.

The informal opening and dedication of the completed building took place on April 29, 1906. On Saturday, August 11, 1906, a formal ceremony to open the building to the public was held, the following Monday, the Emeline Fairbanks Memorial Library opened to the general public.

In 1978, Indiana State University took ownership and following its renovation, it was named Fairbanks Hall in honor of the prominent Terre Haute businessman and philanthropist, responsible for its original construction, Mr. Crawford Fairbanks.

=== Normal Hall ===
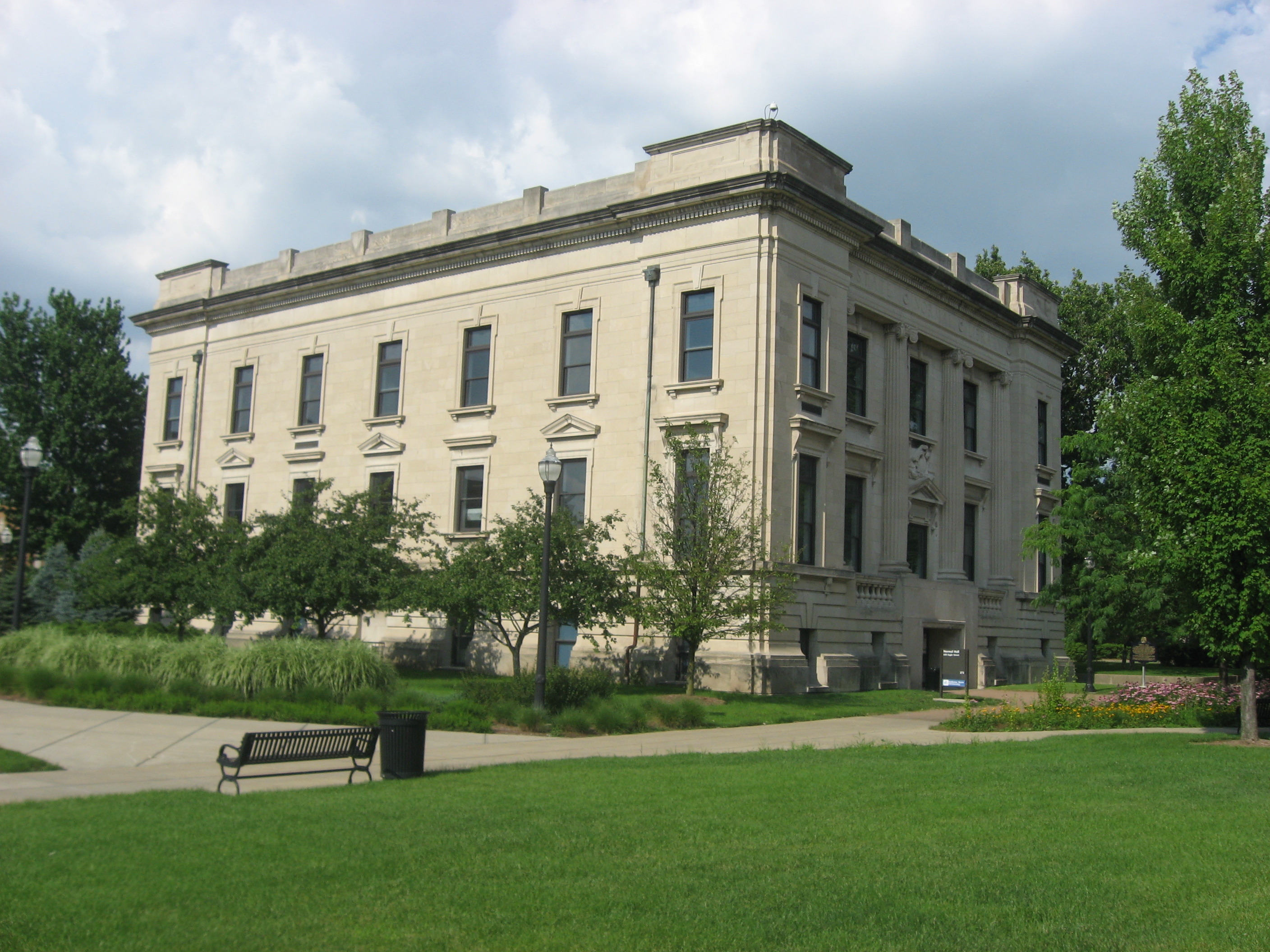
Normal Hall

Originally built as the library in 1909, Normal Hall is the last remaining structure from Indiana State's Normal School era. Normal Hall served as the university library until Cunningham Memorial Library was built in 1974 and named in honor of Indiana State's first Librarian, Arthur Cunningham (1891–1928). On the centennial of Normal Hall's construction, it was announced that it would be fully remodeled and will become a student academic honors center. The 2014–15 renovation was approximately $16 million; the original grand staircase and a stained-glass dome featuring images of at least 24 educators and philosophers were restored and the building now meets ADA requirements.

It was listed on the National Register of Historic Places in 2002.

=== Center for Student Success (CFSS) ===
The Center for Student Success, housed within Normal Hall, provides tutoring, supplemental instruction, mentoring, advising, classroom instruction, counseling, and academic success workshops.

The center also provides specialized support programs including the 21st Century Scholar Corps Program, First-Generation Program, Summer Career Exploration Program (SCEE), Students in Transition Program, and Student Support Services Program which includes assistance to persons with disabilities and special needs, and first-generation, low-income students.

=== University Hall ===
The Indiana State Teachers College Laboratory School was a PWA-funded project, built on land donated to the university by the City of Terre Haute. The initial wing of the building was completed in July 1935. The Sycamore Theater and a gymnasium were completed in 1937 through funding provided by an additional PWA grant. Terre Haute-native Gilbert Brown Wilson added several murals to the interior. The laboratory school operated as a unit of the Vigo County School Corporation. In 2008–09, it was renovated at a cost of $29.8 million and became the new home of the Bayh College of Education.

The Bayh College of Education houses:

- Administrative Placement
- Audiology Clinic
- College of Education
- Blumberg Center for Interdisciplinary Studies in Special Education
- Department of Communication Disorders and Counseling, School, and Educational Psychology
- Department of Curriculum, Instruction, and Media Technology
- Educational Assessment, Research, and Evaluation
- Department of Educational Leadership
- Department of Elementary, Early, and Special Education
- Indiana Principal Leadership Institute
- Instructional and Information Technology
- ISU Educational Development Council
- Teacher Licensure
- Porter School Psychology Center
- Professional Development Schools Partnership
- Rowe Center for Communicative Disorders

=== Federal Hall ===
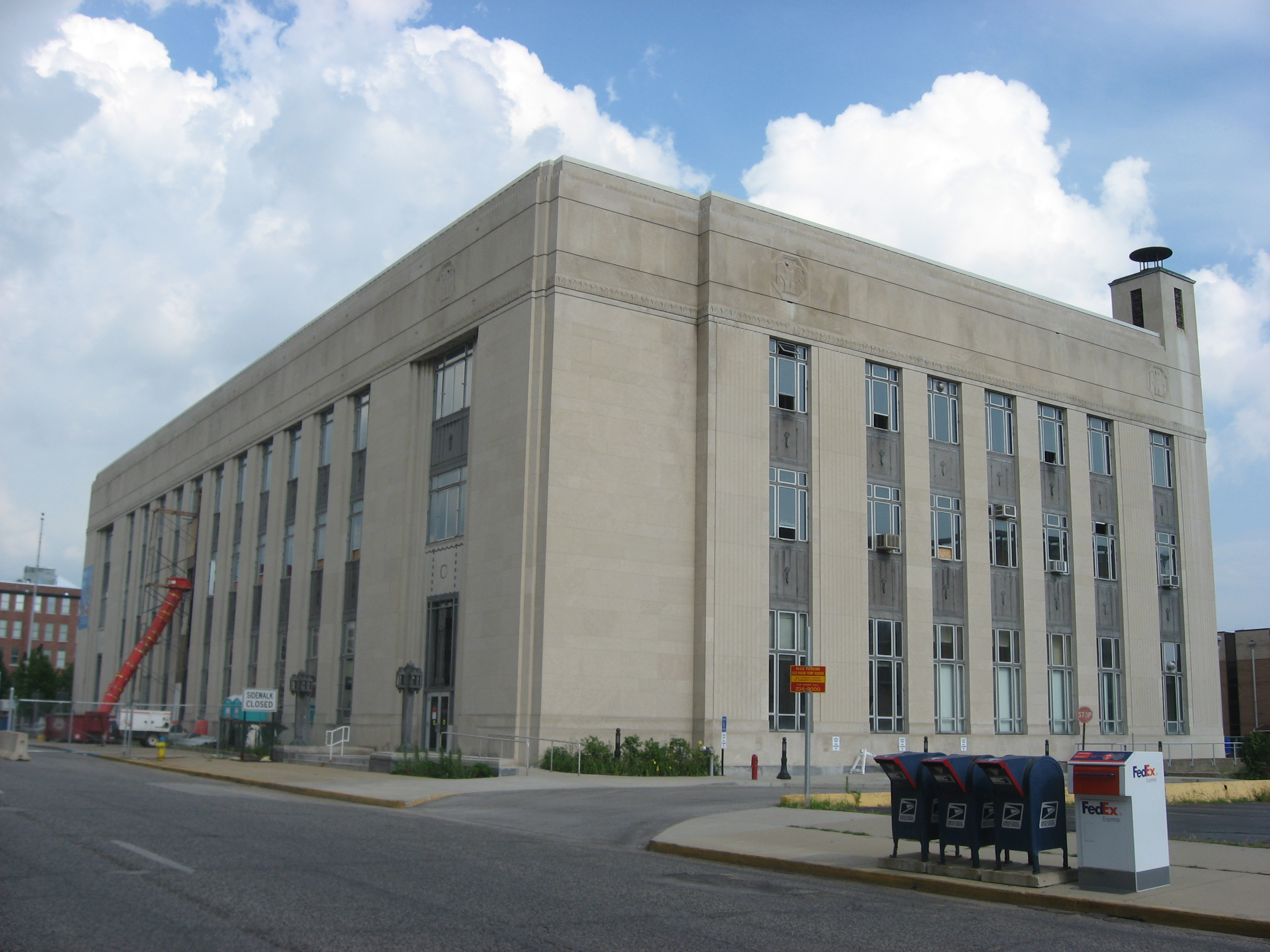
Federal Hall

Federal Hall is the former Terre Haute Post Office & Federal Building, a historic structure in Terre Haute, Indiana.

The current building was funded as a Public Works Administration project under the presidency of Franklin D. Roosevelt; following the razing of the first federal court house. (The columns and pediment from the first post office now make up part of the Chauncey Rose Memorial in Terre Haute's Fairbanks Park.)

The three-story PWA Moderne post office was completed in 1934 to the designs of Terre Haute–based architects Miller & Yeager for the cost of around $450,000. Completed on December 1, 1934, the building opened to the public in 1935. It originally was home to the post office, the Social Security Administration, the Federal Bureau of Investigation, the Internal Revenue Service and the federal court. The federal courtroom features a mural by Frederick Webb Ross titled "The Signing of the Magna Carta."

In 2007, the General Services Administration turned over the facility to Indiana State; after a $30-million dollar, multi-year renovation; the building became the new home of the Indiana State University Scott College of Business. The first classes were held during the Fall 2012 semester.

== Academics ==
=== Students ===
For fall 2023, minority student enrollment was 2,359, which represents 29.22% of total enrollment. The top three international student countries are India, Nigeria, and Ghana. Vigo and Marion County are the two largest counties that enrolled students originate from and approximately 57% of enrolled students originate from the state of Indiana.

Indiana State was the first public university in Indiana to require incoming freshmen to have a laptop. ISU first awarded laptop scholarships to incoming freshmen with high school GPAs of 3.0 or higher (on a 4.0 scale), giving students the option of choosing either a laptop or an iPad. The university now awards a laptop computer to those students who are admitted and are Pell-eligible as determined by the FAFSA.

=== Colleges ===
ISU offers more than 100 programs in the Colleges of Arts & Sciences, Business, Education, Technology, and Health and Human Services. The College of Graduate and Professional Studies offers programs that lead to doctoral and master's degrees. Students can also pursue certificates in a concentrated area of study, enroll in professional development courses, and fulfill continuing education requirements. ISU also offers 20 bachelor's degrees, 22 master's degrees, and 7 doctoral degrees—in addition to many professional certifications—available through Indiana State Online.

Academic rankings

National
- U.S. News & World Report: 363 of 394
- Washington Monthly: 228 of 442
- WSJ/College Pulse: 400 of 400

Indiana State University is organized into six academic colleges:

- Bayh College of Education (est. 1865)
- Donald W. Scott College of Business (est. 1918)
- College of Graduate and Professional Studies (est. 1961)
- College of Arts and Sciences (est. 1962)
- Bailey College of Engineering and Technology (est. 1962)
- College of Health and Human Services (est. 1963)

ISU is also a member of the College Consortium of Western Indiana. This membership allows students who are full-time at their home institution to take classes at the other member institutions of Rose-Hulman Institute of Technology and Saint Mary-of-the-Woods College.

=== Library ===
The Cunningham Memorial Library collections include more than two million items. Undergraduate students may check out most materials for a three-week loan period, using their student ID.

=== Accreditation ===
Indiana State University as a whole has been accredited by The Higher Learning Commission continuously since 1915. The Scott College of Business is accredited by the Association to Advance Collegiate Schools of Business (AACSB) and the Bayh College of Education is accredited by the National Council for Accreditation of Teacher Education (NCATE). The doctoral program in clinical psychology (Psy.D.) is accredited by the American Psychological Association (APA). The School of Music is accredited by the National Association of Schools of Music (NASM). The nursing programs are accredited by the Accreditation Commission for Education in Nursing (ACEN). The Bachelor in Social Work program and the Master in Social Work program are both accredited by the Council on Social Work Education (CSWE). The Doctor of Athletic Training program is accredited by the Commission on Accreditation of Athletic Training Education (CAATE).

==== Campuses ====
Indiana State University-Evansville (now University of Southern Indiana) was created as a branch campus in 1965. Like Ball State University (formerly Indiana State University-Muncie), it became an independent institution of higher education when it was granted independent standing as the University of Southern Indiana in 1985.

=== Student Media ===
Student Media was created in 2012 in a merger of Student Publications and electronic media outlets under Academic Affairs. Since then, in addition to operating the Indiana Statesman, Sycamore Video, and WISU-FM; Student Media has grown to include The Sycamore, a digital yearbook; Syc Creations, a client-driven video and web production group; the Indiana State Sports Network, which produces video for ESPN3 and ESPN+; WZIS, a student-staffed station created when WISU converted to a public radio format; and the Center for Innovation in Technology and Digital Media. While the center is the newest venture, Student Media outlets have been a part of the Indiana State experience for decades. The Statesman dates back to 1895 and WISU first went on the air in the early 1960s. The Sycamore, long an institution at Indiana State, was suspended in 1993 and revived in 2013–14.

== University traditions ==
=== Donaghy Day ===
Named for Fred Donaghy, graduate of the Normal School (1912) and a professor of life sciences, this tradition was initiated in 1976 as a day set aside for the community to celebrate the season and to work to help beautify the campus and surrounding community; Donaghy Day is now conducted during the first week of the fall semester and is used to acquaint new students with the university's commitment to community engagement.

=== Homecoming ===
ISU's homecoming dates back to December 15, 1917, when Birch Bayh Sr. asked Charlotte Burford, Dean of Women if State could have a Blue and White Day similar to DePauw's Black and Gold Day. At that time it was merely an alumni reunion with the big event being the alumni varsity basketball game. The start of Blue and White Day began December 3, 1921, which included religious exercises, "The Alumni Welcome", a performance by the school orchestra, a pep session, noon luncheon, and the alumni varsity basketball game. Homecoming 1922 brought the addition of "Friday Night Affair" which was a theater party and pep session held at the Indiana Theater. The start of what is now the largest student-organized parade in the nation was December 8, 1923. "The Spirit of Normal," drawn by two white horses was the winning float, with the honor going to Omega Sorority. The annual bonfire and football game was added to the activities in November 1935. Going up against Rose-Poly (now Rose-Hulman), ISNS, won 25–6. It wasn't until sometime in the mid-30s that "Homecoming" was officially adopted as the actual name for the annual celebration.

1937 marked the first year that a Homecoming Queen was crowned. That honor went to Bette Whitmore of Kappa sorority (now Alpha Omicron Pi). The Bachelor of the Year became a part of Homecoming from 1974 to 1989. In 1992, a major change occurred in the traditional contest to diversify and become more inclusive of the student body. The Sycamore Court replaced the Queen and Bachelor of Year to include one female and one male representative from Greek, Residence Hall, African- American, International, Commuter, and Graduate students. It was decided to discontinue the contest entirely in 1993, due to few students participating in the voting of candidates.

The Sycamore Cup Tricycle Derby, a ten-lap race, was added to the growing list of events in 1963. Students rode children's tricycles around the "Quad." The winners were Reeve Hall for the women and Parsons Hall for the men. The popularity of the race became such that students wanted to make the event more prestigious. Thus, in 1967 larger tricycles were customized using frames from Sting-Ray model bicycles. The race moved from the Quad to Marks Field adding more laps and introducing exchanges to make it more competitive. Riders then began conditioning exercises and practices. Due to resurfacing of Marks Field in 1992, the race was moved to ISU's Driver Education Center at the Wabash Valley Fairgrounds located five miles south of campus. Today, the race is held at Recreation East which was dedicated in Spring 2000 as the new home for Trike and Tandem races. During the 2005 Homecoming Tricycle Derby festivities, the Michael Simmons Student Activity Center and Susan M. Bareford classroom were dedicated. This building, which is adjacent to the Recreation Track, serves as the headquarters for the two races as well as provides much needed multipurpose space.

The annual Blue and White Dance was always a popular formal dance held either in the Mayflower Room of the Terre Haute House or the Heritage and State Rooms in Tirey Memorial Student Union. Sycamore Showcase replaced the dance in 1968. The first year featured trumpeter Al Hirt with the Tijuana Brass. Throughout the next few years, performers included Bill Cosby, Dionne Warwick, Sergio Mendes and Brazil '66, Johnny Carson and Doc Severinsen, and Bob Hope. For several years the Sycamore Showcase was replaced with smaller comedy shows because of the difficulty of getting big-name talent to book on specific dates and their reluctance to appear in smaller venues.

Major events today include a campus-wide Blue and White Homecoming Parade, Sycamore Tricycle Derby, Stompin', Torchlight Parade, Pep Rally, Tent City, and the Football Game.

The Walk is an Indiana State Homecoming tradition that began in the late 70s. The Walk begins at 6AM on gameday when a large number of students, reaching in the thousands, make the two mile walk east on Wabash Avenue towards the Football Stadium, stopping and having a drink at each bar along the way. In recent years Indiana State University has launched new program to make the walk safer for all. In 2009, the university launched “SoberRide” and “Designated Walker” programs for homecoming. The walk also coincides with the Blue and White parade that runs throughout downtown Terre Haute on game day.

The Walk can be traced back to the late 1970s when students walked from Saturday night football games back to campus, stopping for a beer at every establishment that served beer on Wabash.

=== Founders Day ===
Conducted in January or February of each year, this event commemorates the opening of the institution in 1870 when 23 students presented themselves to a faculty of three on the first day of classes at the Indiana State Normal School.

=== Mascots ===
The school has had two mascots. Early on in the school's history, the athletes were referred to as the "Fighting Teachers" until the students chose the name "Sycamores", from the abundance of Sycamore trees in Indiana and especially in the Wabash River Valley; though it is believed that the students voted on 'Sycamores' on a lark, never thinking it would win. During the 1950s and 60s, the sycamore tree itself was used as Indiana State's mascot, with a student dressed in a tree costume. However, as a tree does not lend itself well to an athletic mascot, especially considering Indiana State's in-state rivalries with the Ball State Cardinals and Butler Bulldogs, the university created an Indian mascot named Chief Ouabachi, and his Princess, in 1969.

This change paid homage to the fact that ISU was the "State" university of a state named after Indians (before statehood Indiana was primarily inhabited by Indians). However, the university stopped using Chief Ouabachi as a mascot in 1989. For six years, Indiana State did not have a mascot. In 1995, the university welcomed Sycamore Sam to the ISU family. The blue-and-white creature is a favorite among young and old alike.

==== Sycamores ====
In 1921 a contest was held to pick a name for the athletic teams at what was then called the Indiana State Normal School. Until that time, the term "Fighting Teachers" was frequently used in press accounts of athletic contests. In January 1922, it was announced that the name Sycamores had won a popular vote of the student body. Indiana State University has used this team name ever since.

=== Spring Week and Tandem ===
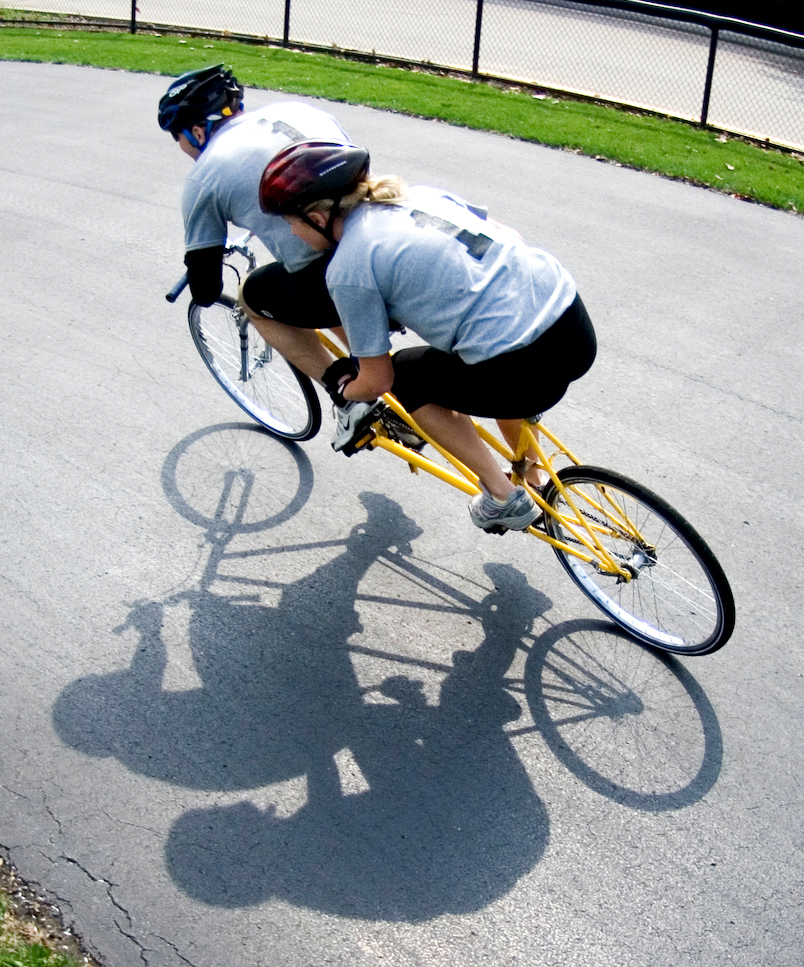
Tandem race

Spring Week Began in 1970 as part of Indiana State University's official Centennial Celebration. The major highlight of Spring Week is the Tandem Race—thought to be the only co-ed tandem bicycle race in the nation. Today, Spring Week is the largest all-campus activity in the spring. The activities include community service, educational, recreational, entertainment, and competitive involvement for students and organizations.

Tandem teams are composed of campus organizations—providing 10 male and female riders, plus two alternates. Organizations enter individually and are paired by drawings.

The 1970 tandem race featured 25 laps on a course through Fairbanks Park on the bank of the Wabash River. Included in the event were competitive games, special entertainment, and a carnival presented by campus organizations. In 1971, the race took place at the Wabash Valley Fairgrounds on the Action Track, a half-mile oval dirt track. It consisted of a 50-mile, 100- lap test of endurance and speed. Activities included midget-races, skydiving, arts and crafts, entertainment, and full-fledged carnival with rides.

The race returned to Fairbanks Park in 1972, then moved to campus in 1973. The race was held in the city streets, which surrounded Sycamore Tower Complex (4th, 5th, Chestnut, and Mulberry Streets). The name “Tandemonia” was coined to replace “Spring Week”. The race moves again in 1974 to Marks Field and consisted of 100 laps or 25 miles on a quarter-mile track. Seventeen teams competed in the race. Corners were close, but no wrecks were caused by the track itself. The 1976 Tandemonia Committee decided to begin the process of “changing over” from Schwinn bikes to newer, lightweight bikes.

Tandemonia 1991 included a Tandem kick-off that replaced the Donaghy Day activities and Tandem Games. Tandemfest, a lip-sync contest was held in Tilson Music Hall, Yell-Like-Hell, the Baseball Rally, and the actual race continued in their traditional pattern.

Due to resurfacing Mark's Field for major track events, the race was moved to the Driver's Education Center at the Wabash Valley Fairgrounds in 1993. Nineteen races were held on Mark's Field.

The 25th anniversary was held in 1995 with “Tandemonia” changing back to “Spring Week” and activities more like the original event, including a campus carnival. The 1996 Spring Week Committee emphasized involving more individuals, as well as residence hall students, by providing a roller blade contest and having pairing decorate windows in Residence Halls rather than in sorority suites. The race continued at the Wabash Valley Fairgrounds through April 1999. Seven races were held at the Driver's Education facility. In February 2000 the Tandem practice was moved to the new track at the Recreation East Facility located on 9th and Spruce Streets on the ISU campus. Nine teams competed on April 15, 2000, for a place in the history books as the first race on the new track.

The Michael Simmons Activity Center was added to the Recreation East complex in 2005. This building has added a new dimension to the practices and race by providing officials a central place to score the race and fans to have bleachers for better viewing of the competition.

==== Blue and White ====
In 1899, it was announced that Yale Blue and White would replace the colors of Salmon Pink and White. The colors are also applied to the Blue and White Parade and the Blue and White Dance held during Homecoming each fall.

==== Book and torch ====
The book and torch are official symbols of the university and are featured in its seal. The book symbolizes knowledge and truth gained here and the torch symbolizes the light of inspiration that comes to students in these halls

==== Book and Torch Ceremony ====
This traditional ceremony marks the commitment of the senior class to become active alumni of Indiana State. Historically, each senior class was charged with adding to the Parsons-Sandison Living Memorial Fund, a scholarship fund for Indiana State students. This tradition encompasses two ceremonies, the first of which is on Founder's Day (generally in January), at which time the president of the Alumni Board charges the senior class to commit to the university. At commencement, another ceremony is conducted. As part of this ceremony, the senior class answers the challenge of commitment, as they become alumni of the university.

=== Trike ===
The Indiana State Tricycle Derby was first run in 1963 as a 10-lap race around the sidewalks of the Quadrangle on children's tricycles. The races featured a men's and women's division (the Powder Puff Derby). The races now feature men's and women's teams racing on specially built tricycles at the new Recreation East complex at Ninth and Sycamore streets. In October 2005, the Michael Simmons Student Activity Center opened at Rec East, featuring commemorative displays chronicling the history and the participants of trike and tandem, containing bleacher seating, an all-purpose room, restrooms, an observation deck, and storage.

== Songs ==
=== Fight song ===
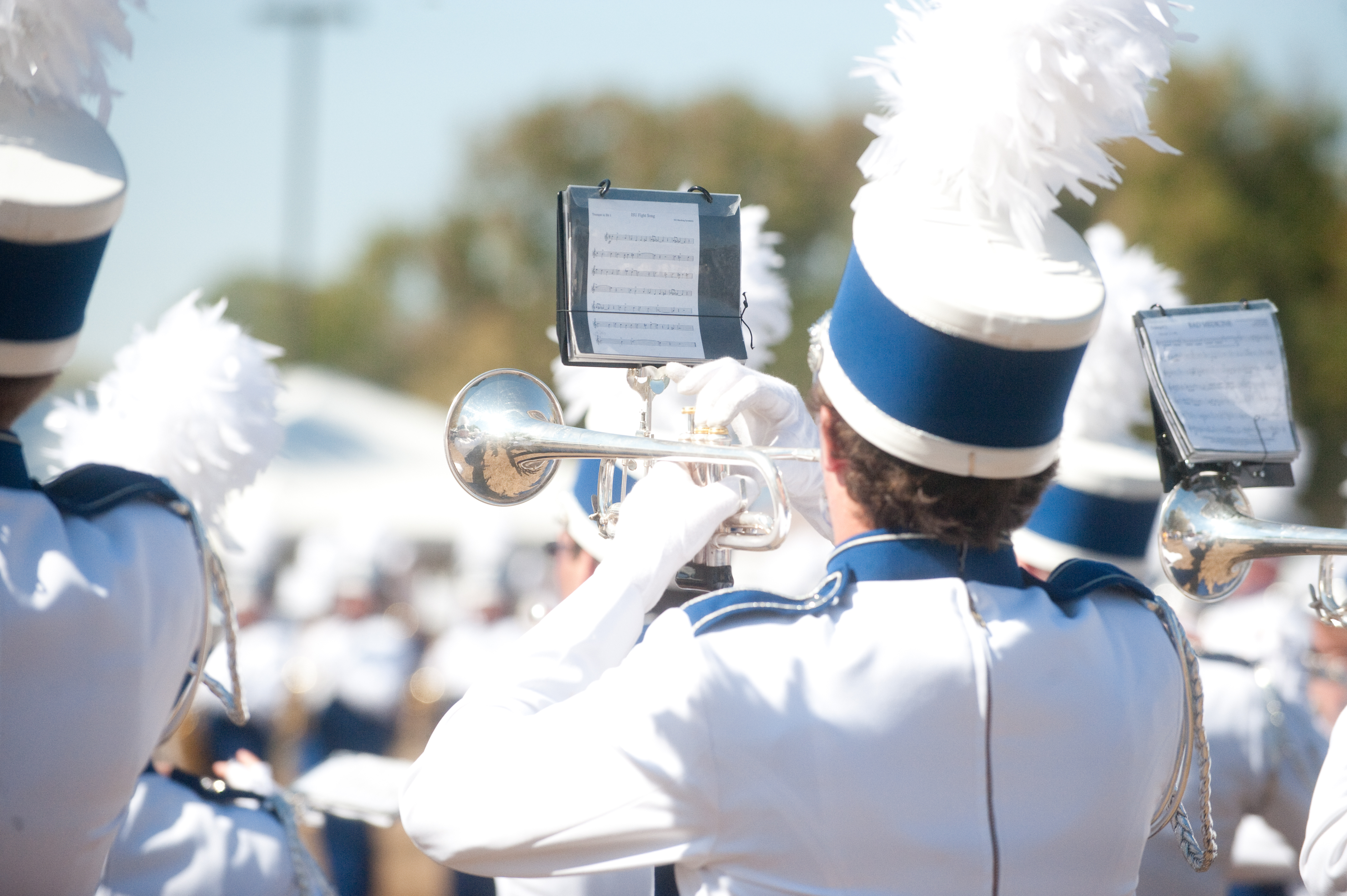
Marching Sycamores

"March On! (You Fighting Sycamores)", the university's fight song, was authored and arranged by Joseph A. Gramelspacher, an ISU professor of music, as a pep song. It was first performed at a homecoming eve pep rally on October 20, 1939.

Before "March On!", the school's fight song was "Cheer for the Blue and White", composed in 1931 as part of the Indiana State Teachers College song contest.

In addition to The Marching Sycamores (Pride of Indiana), the School of Music provides other ensembles for music students: Concert Band, Jazz Combos, Jazz Ensemble, Percussion Ensemble, Steel Drum Band, University Symphony, Wind Orchestra, Wind Symphony, Sycamore Basketball Band, Choral Ensembles, Concert Choir, Masterworks Chorale, Music Theater/Opera, Sycamore Singers, and Women's Chorale.

=== Alma mater ===
Charles M. Curry, Professor of English and Literature authored The Alma Mater. It was originally entitled, "Indiana's Normal" and first printed in a June 1912 issue of the Normal Advance. Dr. Curry used the music of Annie Lisle for The Alma Mater.

== Athletics ==
The school's athletic teams are known as the Sycamores. They participate in the Division I Missouri Valley Conference and NCAA FCS Missouri Valley Football Conference.

Athletically, it is known as the alma mater of basketball player Larry Bird; World Champion gymnast Kurt Thomas; and Olympic, World, and Pan-American Champion freestyle wrestler Bruce Baumgartner. Basketball coach John Wooden coached the Sycamores before accepting the head coaching position at UCLA. The men's basketball team played their first season in 1896, making them the oldest team in the NCAA along with Bucknell, Minnesota, Washington and Yale, winning the 1950 NAIB National Championship and finishing as National Runner-Up in 1946 and 1948. They were also the NCAA College Division (Div II) National Runner-Up in 1968 and the Division I National Runner-Up in 1979. The 1950 team comprised the core of the 1951 Pan-American Gold Medal Team. In 1971, Coach Grete Treiber led the ISU Women's gymnastics team to a National Runner-up finish at the AIAW National Championships. Kurt Thomas led the Men's Gymnastics Team to the 1977 NCAA National Championship. Men's tennis player Vedran Vidovic holds the NCAA Division I record for most consecutive singles victories by winning 37 matches in a row from March 18, 2001, to October 28 of the same year.

=== Facilities ===
Hulman Center, originally named Hulman Civic-University Center, is a multi-use arena that opened in December 1973. It seats 10,200 people for basketball and is home to the Indiana State University Sycamores men's and women's basketball teams of the Missouri Valley Conference. It has hosted multiple concerts and the Missouri Valley Conference men's basketball tournament title game in 1979, the year legendary Larry Bird helped the undefeated Sycamores reach the championship game of the NCAA tournament. The Hulman Center hosted the 1974 Midwest Region of the NCAA Tournament which featured Creighton, Texas, Oral Roberts, Syracuse, Louisville, and Kansas. It reopened after a two-year, $50 million renovation in December 2020.

The baseball field is located within a mile of the main campus along the Wabash River. Bob Warn Field at Sycamore Stadium is home to the Sycamore Baseball program and played host to the 2014, 2016, and 2023 Missouri Valley Conference Baseball Championship, as well as the 2023 Terre Haute Regional as part of the NCAA Division I Baseball Tournament. Memorial Stadium, the home field for Indiana State's NCAA Football Championship Subdivision football team of the Missouri Valley Football Conference, and the women's soccer team is located on Wabash Avenue, two miles (3 km) east of the main campus. The Gibson Track and Field Complex is the newest athletic facility at Indiana State and is located along the Wabash River on the west side of campus. It hosted the 2016 and 2024 Missouri Valley Conference Track and Field Championships. Price Field is the home for the Sycamore Softball team.

Indiana State University has hosted thirteen (2002, 2004–2011, 2013–2014, 2016, 2019) NCAA Division I cross country championships at the LaVern Gibson Championship Cross Country Course, and was once again selected to host them in 2026. The school has hosted the NCAA Great Lakes Regional seven times (1998, 1999, 2001, 2003, 2017, 2018 and 2022), and also the NCAA Division III cross country championships in 2012 and 2024, as well as numerous track and field high school state championships through the IHSAA.

The university also hosted the 1975 NCAA Gymnastics National Championships and hosted the tenth NCAA Wrestling Championships in 1937; the school had yet to establish a wrestling program.

=== Men ===
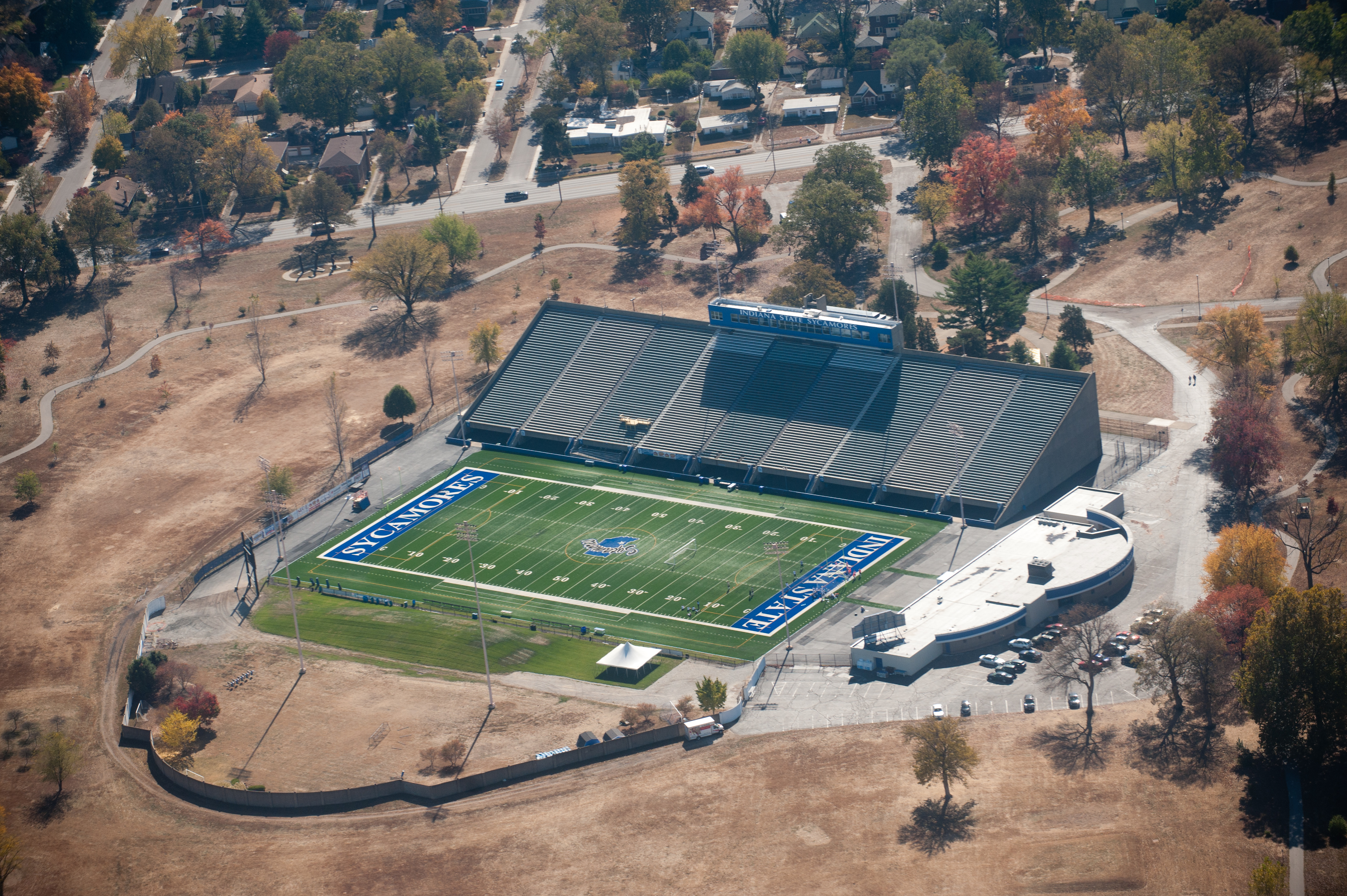
Memorial Stadium

- Baseball – Bob Warn Field at Sycamore Stadium
- Basketball – Hulman Center
- Cross country – LaVern Gibson Championship Cross Country Course, Wabash Valley Family Sports Center
- Football – Memorial Stadium
- Track and field – Gibson Track and Field

=== Women ===
- Basketball – Hulman Center
- Cross country – LaVern Gibson Championship Cross Country Course, Wabash Valley Family Sports Center
- Soccer – Memorial Stadium
- Track and field – Gibson Track and Field
- Softball – Price Field at Eleanor Forsythe St. John Softball Complex
- Golf – multiple (The Country Club of Terre Haute {private}; Idle Creek {semi-private}, Rea Park {public} and Hulman Links {public} Golf Courses)
- Volleyball – ISU Arena
- Swimming – Vigo County Aquatic Center
